= 2020–21 South-West Indian Ocean cyclone season =

Cyclone season in the Southwest Indian Ocean

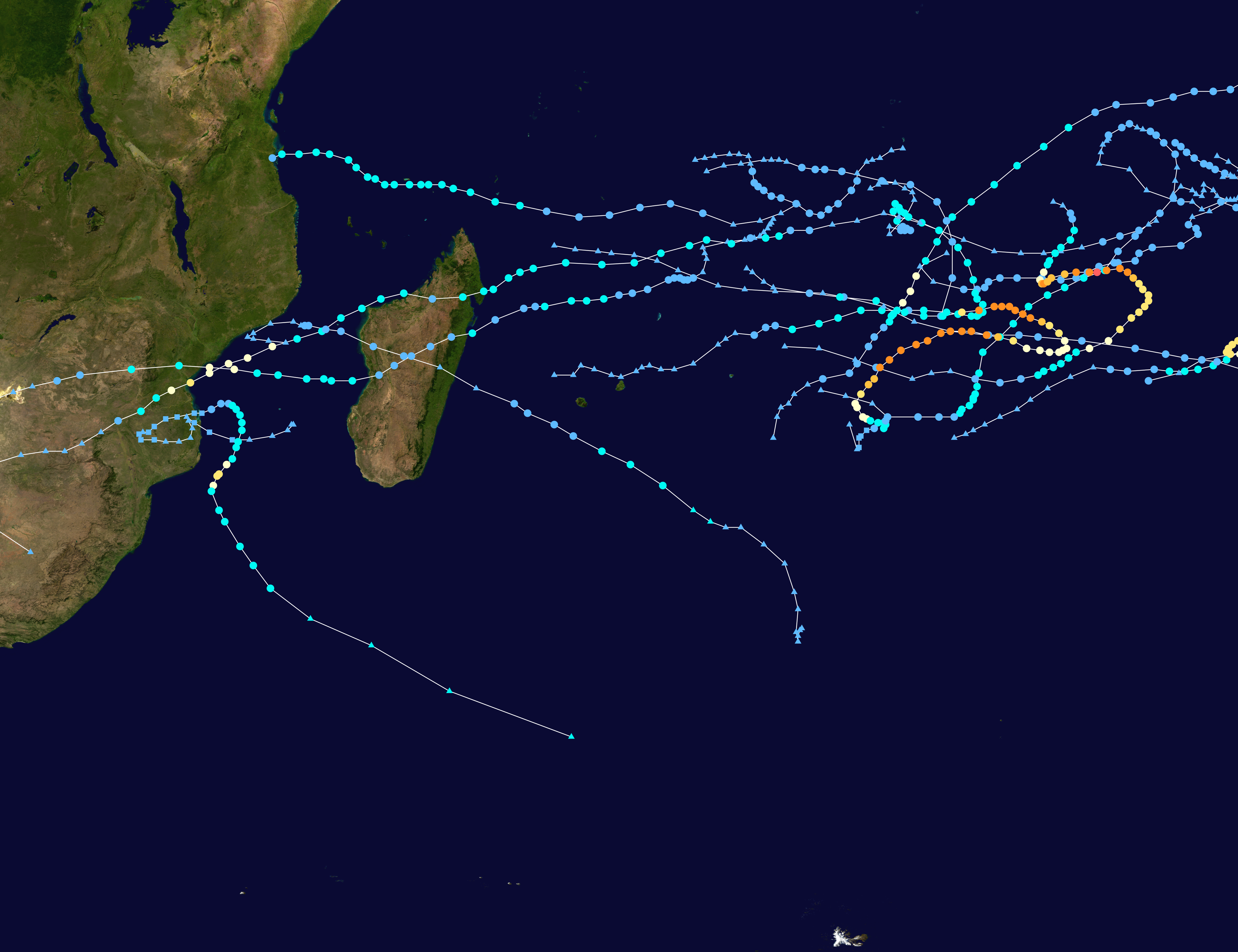
- Season summary map

Seasonal boundaries
- First system formed: 12 November 2020
- Last system dissipated: 24 April 2021

Strongest storm
- Name: Faraji and Habana
  - Maximum winds: 220 km/h (140 mph) (10-minute sustained)
  - Lowest pressure: 935 hPa (mbar)

Seasonal statistics
- Total disturbances: 16
- Total depressions: 16
- Total storms: 12
- Tropical cyclones: 7
- Intense tropical cyclones: 2
- Very intense tropical cyclones: 2
- Total fatalities: 56 total
- Total damage: > $90.1 million (2021 USD)

Related articles
- 2020–21 Australian region cyclone season; 2020–21 South Pacific cyclone season

The 2020–21 South-West Indian Ocean cyclone season was an above-average season which produced 12 named storms, with 7 strengthening into tropical cyclones. The season started with the formation of Cyclone Alicia in the extreme northeast section of the basin on 12 November 2020, just before the official start of the season, which marked the third season in a row in which a tropical cyclone formed before the official start of the season. It officially began on 15 November 2020, and ended with the dissipation of Cyclone Jobo on 24 April, 6 days before the official end on 30 April 2021, with the exception of Mauritius and the Seychelles, which officially ended on 15 May 2021. These dates conventionally delimit the period of each year when most tropical and subtropical cyclones form in the basin, which is west of 90°E and south of the Equator. Tropical and subtropical cyclones in this basin are monitored by the Regional Specialised Meteorological Centre in Réunion and unofficially by the Joint Typhoon Warning Center.

The season was an active season with several notable storms. At the beginning of the season in December, Tropical Storm Chalane hit Mozambique, followed by the stronger and more damaging Cyclone Eloise less than a month later. Both storms caused 34 fatalities and about $10 million in damage. Afterward, Cyclone Faraji formed, strengthening into a very intense tropical cyclone, marking the second season in a row to feature a storm of the type, staying well away from land in its passage. Cyclone Guambe formed as Faraji was weakening, hitting Mozambique as a subtropical system, the third and final occurrence for the country during the season. Toward the end of the season, Cyclone Jobo formed and impacted Seychelles and brought very minor impacts to Tanzania, becoming the first cyclone to affect the latter country in some form since a tropical cyclone in 1952 despite being a remnant low at the time.

== Seasonal summary ==
On 12 November, Alicia formed on the extreme northeast section of the basin. This formation marked the third season in a row in which a tropical cyclone developed before the official start of the season. Alicia strengthened into a tropical cyclone on 15 November, rapidly weakened due to the vertical wind shear and cool waters, and dissipated on 17 November. On 14 November, another tropical disturbance formed off the coast of Madagascar; however, on 16 November the system failed to organize due to unfavourable vertical wind shear according to JTWC. It rapidly weakened and dissipated the next day. The basin remained quiet until, on 30 November, a tropical low crossed over from the Australian region. It strengthened into a moderate tropical storm, then to a severe tropical storm, and was named Bongoyo. Two additional lows formed, one formed but exited the basin on 20 December and another Zone of Disturbed Weather formed near Diego Garcia, which strengthened to Severe Tropical Storm Chalane, which made landfall on Madagascar and Mozambique, the first tropical cyclone for this season to make landfall. The same Zone of Disturbed Weather which exited on 20 December, again re-entered on 28 December, following with another Zone of Disturbed Weather, designated 06.

On 1 January, 06 intensified into Tropical Storm Danilo. It became the second longest system and dissipated on 12 January. On 15 January, a new disturbance which became depression formed which later became Cyclone Eloise and made two landfalls over Madagascar and Mozambique with second landfall being more catastrophic and brought widespread damages over African nations killing 16 people. On 17 January, Joshua entered the South-West Indian Ocean as a moderate tropical storm; however, it dissipated on 19 January as it entered an area of dry air and high vertical wind shear. On 27 January, Tropical Low 10U entered from the Australian region where it was redesignated as Tropical Depression 09. On 5 February, a tropical depression formed and intensified into Cyclone Faraji, which further became into an intense tropical cyclone, and later a very intense tropical cyclone becoming both the first intense tropical cyclone and the first very intense tropical cyclone of the season. After Faraji, Guambe formed and peaked as a Category 2 tropical cyclone. At the end of February, Marian from the Australian region briefly entered the basin. On 2 March, two tropical depressions formed that were later named Habana and Iman. Iman dissipated quickly, but Habana strengthened into an intense tropical cyclone and stayed active for two weeks. After Habana was a depression that formed on 25 March, but dissipated after three days. Another period of inactivity then ensued, until a zone of disturbed weather formed on 18 April. It was later named Jobo.

== Systems ==
=== Tropical Cyclone Alicia ===
- Tropical cyclone (MFR)
- Category 1 tropical cyclone (SSHWS)
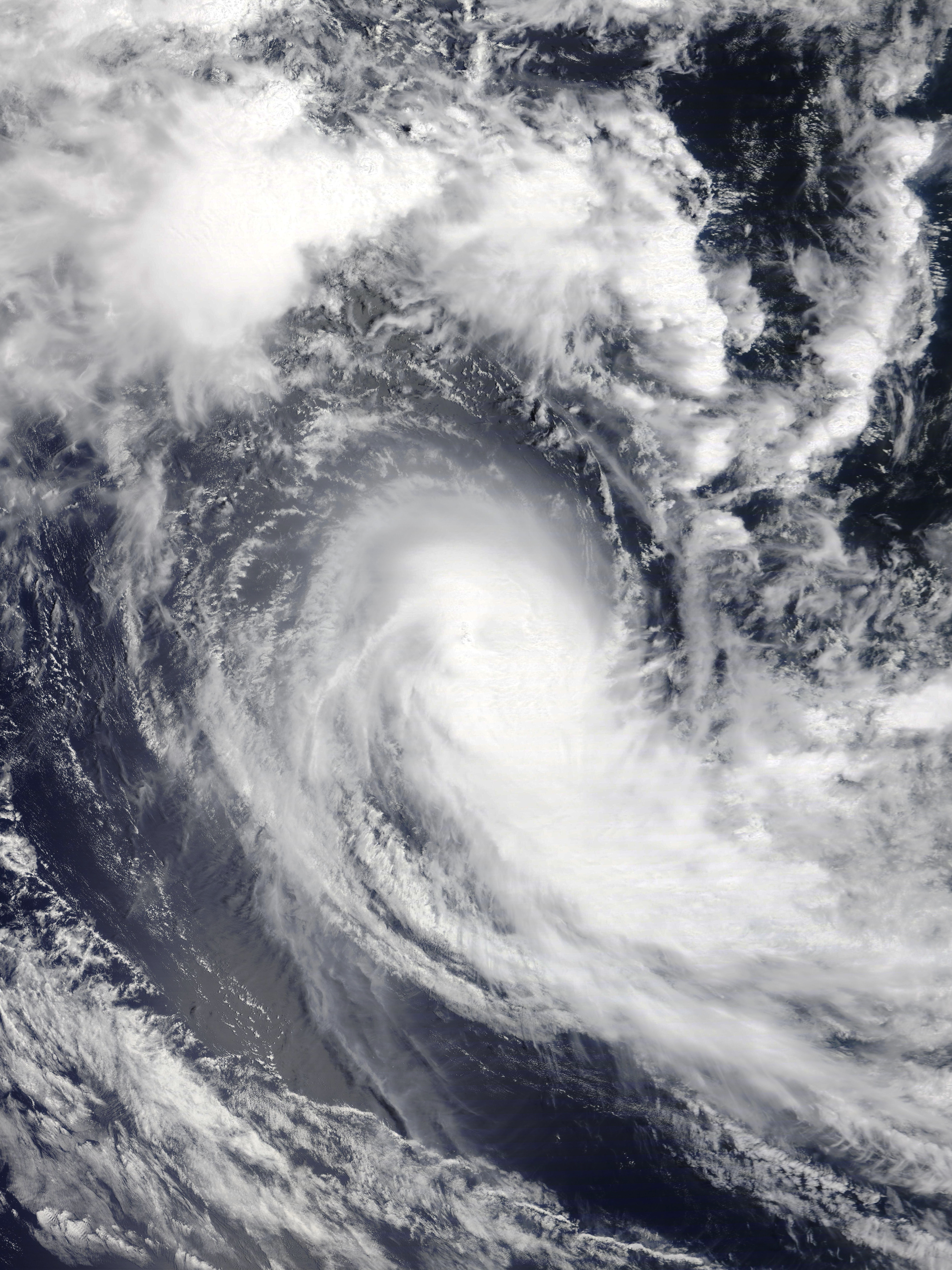
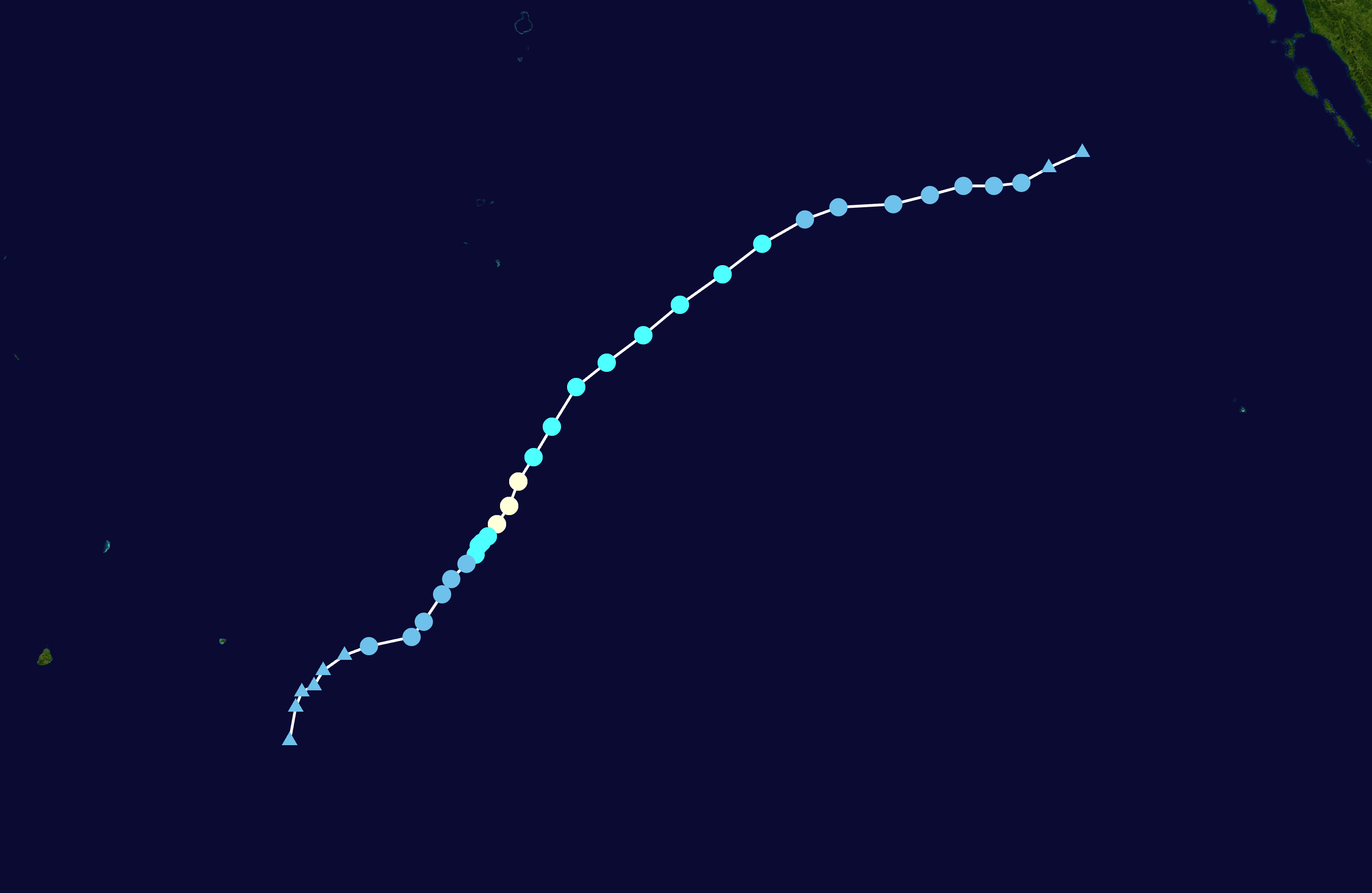
- Duration: 12 November – 17 November
- Peak intensity: 120 km/h (75 mph) (10-min); 975 hPa (mbar)

On 12 November, Météo-France La Réunion (MFR) also began tracking a tropical disturbance as it moved slowly westwards over the central Indian Ocean. Later that day, the JTWC issued a Tropical Cyclone Formation Alert. The disturbance slowly consolidated as thunderstorms wrapped around the center of circulation, and it became a tropical depression by 00:00 UTC on 13 November. The depression continued to become more organized over the day with flaring convection over the center, and thus was upgraded to Moderate Tropical Storm Alicia at 18:00 UTC that same day. On 14 November at 06:00 UTC, Alicia strengthened into a severe tropical storm. Alicia generally moved rapidly in a southwesterly direction due to the steering flow of a mid-level subtropical ridge to the storm's southeast. The severe tropical storm intensified into Tropical Cyclone Alicia at 00:00 UTC on 16 November, after very deep convection developed near its center. Soon after Alicia entered a region with high wind shear and cooler waters. Due to these unfavorable conditions, Alicia began to rapidly weaken, weakening to a tropical storm at 12:00 UTC on 16 November. At 09:00 UTC on 17 November, the Joint Typhoon Warning Center issued its final warning on the storm.

=== Tropical Depression 02 ===
- Tropical depression (MFR)
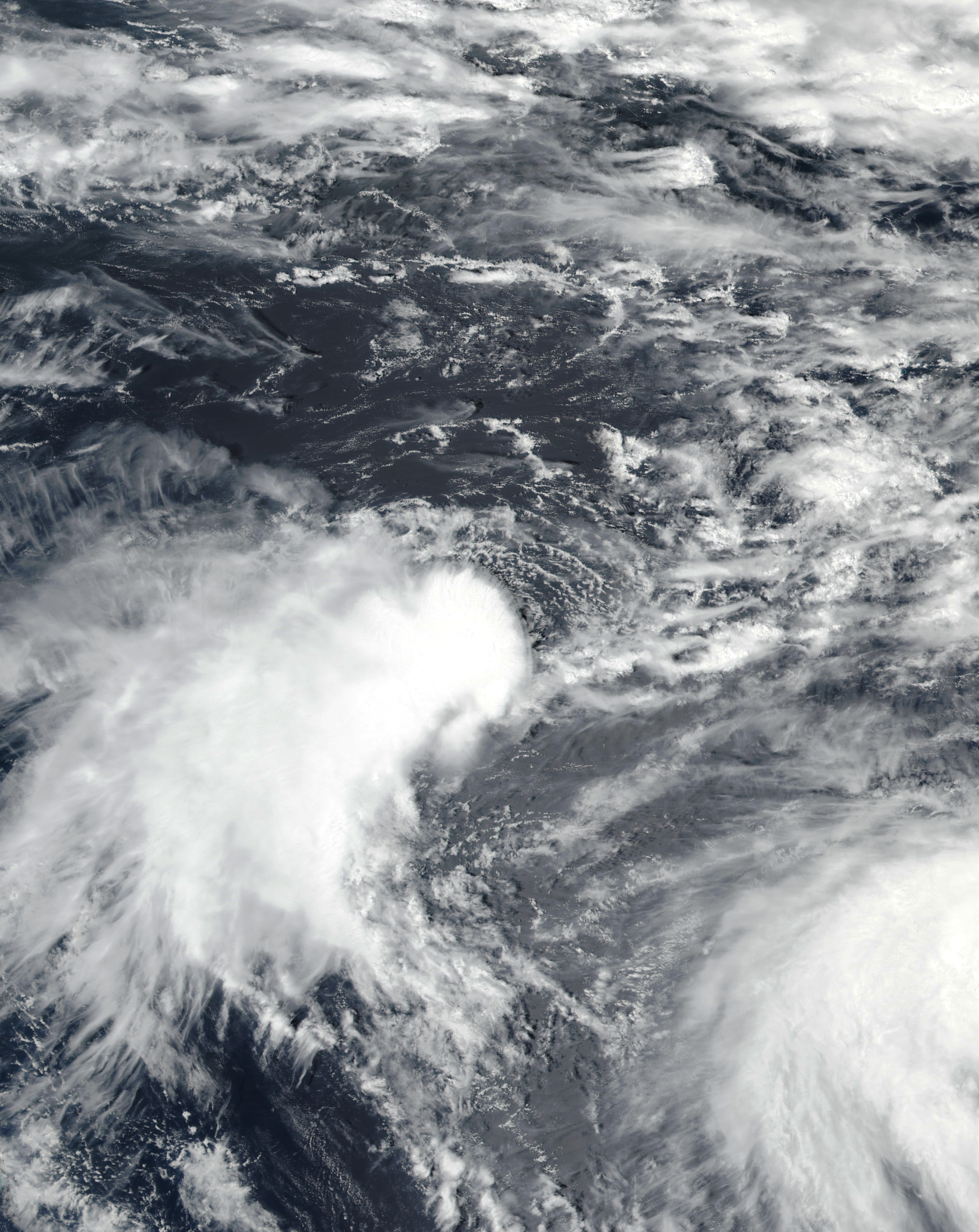
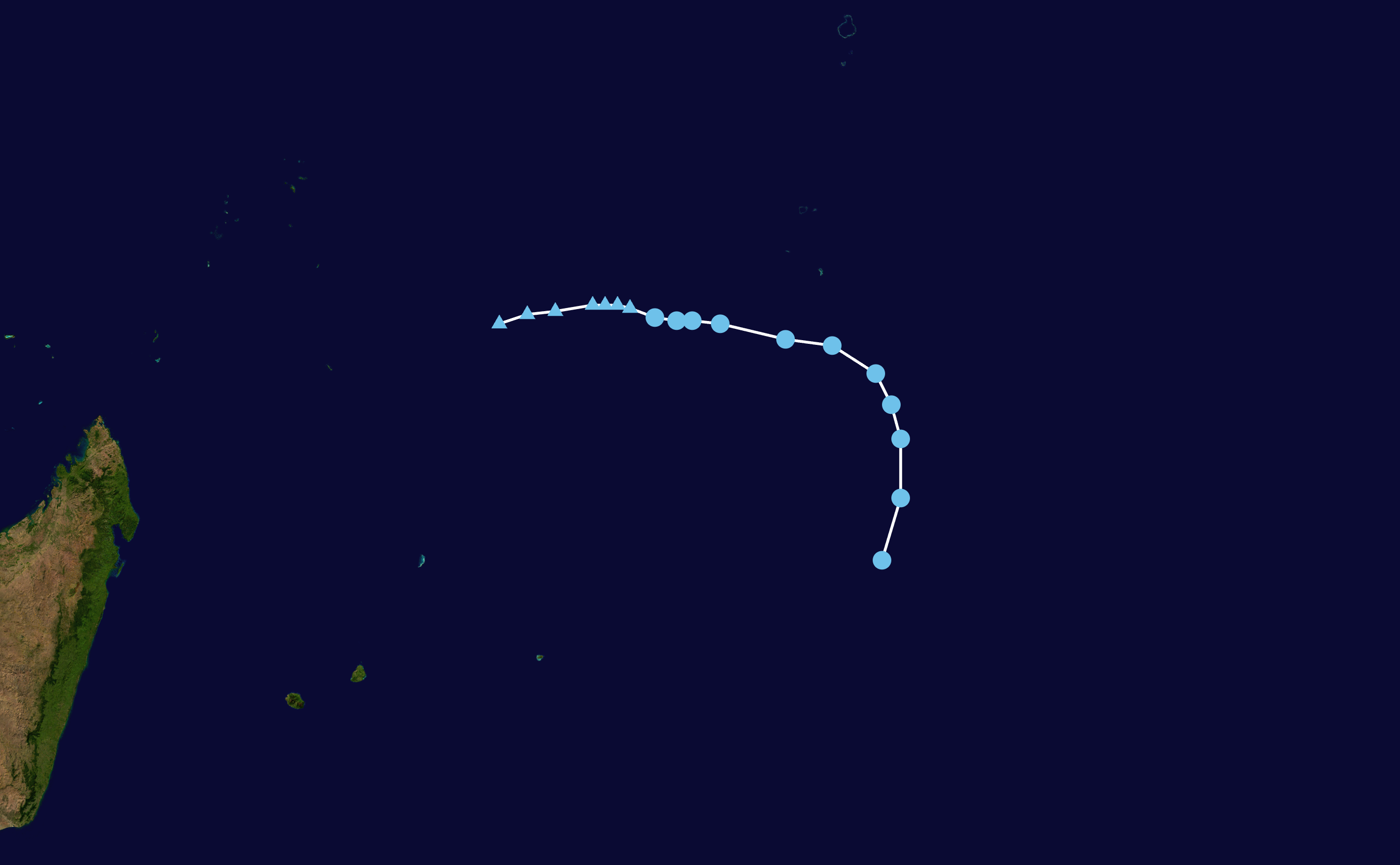
- Duration: 14 November – 17 November
- Peak intensity: 55 km/h (35 mph) (10-min); 999 hPa (mbar)

On 12 November, along with the precursor disturbance of Cyclone Alicia, Météo-France La Réunion (MFR) began to monitor another monsoonal disturbance to the west of Cyclone Alicia's precursor for potential tropical cyclogenesis. By 14 November, an area of disturbed weather had formed but struggled to centralize its thunderstorm activity, despite consolidating a low level circulation. With improvements in further consolidation, the MFR initiated advisories for a tropical depression in the northeast of Madagascar at 18:00 UTC on 15 November. The storm struggled to intensify much due to strong easterly shear from its close proximity to Tropical Cyclone Alicia's outflow, and thus had its thunderstorm activity sheared to its west for most of its lifetime. Due to this, the JTWC cancelled the Tropical Cyclone Formation Alert on 16 November. It rapidly weakened and the last advisory was issued by the MFR on 16 November as well.

=== Severe Tropical Storm Bongoyo ===
- Severe tropical storm (MFR)
- Tropical storm (SSHWS)
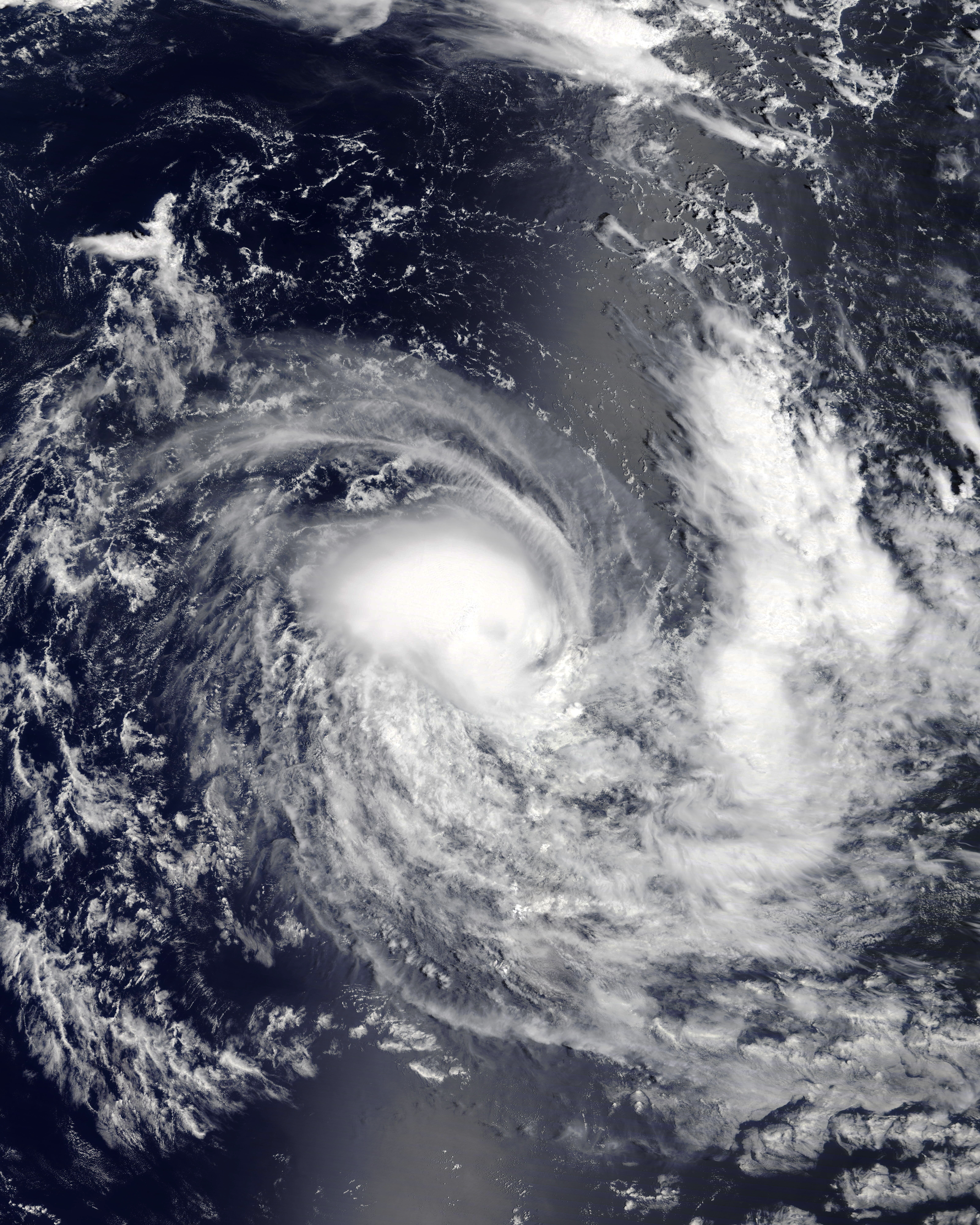
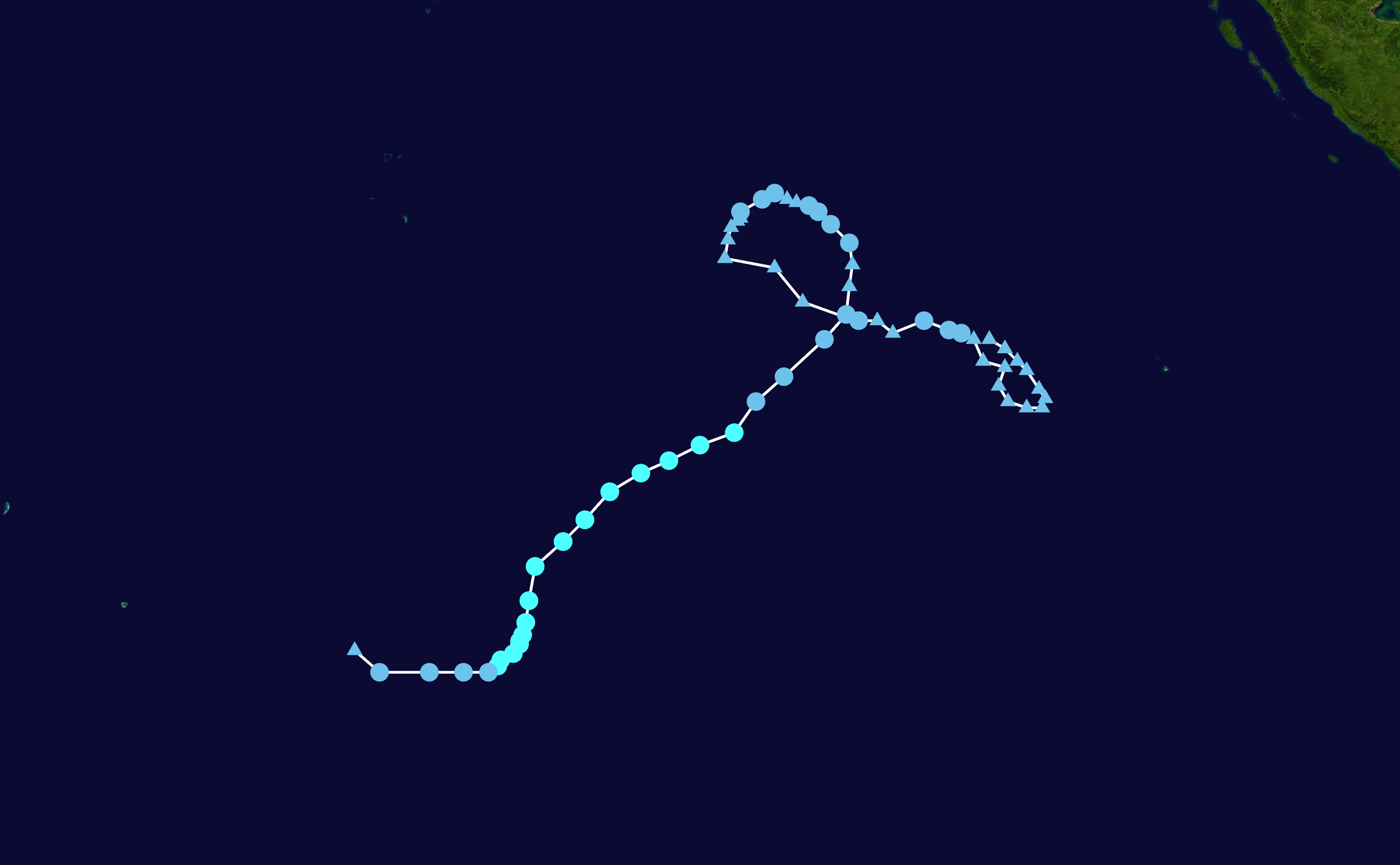
- Duration: 4 December – 10 December
- Peak intensity: 110 km/h (70 mph) (10-min); 980 hPa (mbar)

During 30 November, Tropical Low 01U moved into the basin from the Australian region, where it was classified as a Zone of Disturbed Weather by RSMC La Réunion. Early on 4 December, the JTWC issued a Tropical Cyclone Formation Alert on the system. After meandering slowly to the west and northwest for several days with little change in strength, the system began to take a more southerly track and at 06:00 UTC on 6 December was upgraded to Tropical Disturbance 03 by MFR as the low level circulation became tighter and convection consolidated near the center. On 7 December, the disturbance intensified into Moderate Tropical Storm Bongoyo as an ASCAT pass revealed gale-force winds on the southern half of the circulation. At this time, the JTWC cited a favorable environment for further intensification as Bongoyo headed southwest. While Bongoyo gained a distinct mid-level eye and strong bursts of convection were maintained near the center as the storm further strengthened to severe tropical storm status at 00:00 UTC on 8 December.

However, Bongoyo's intensification trend was halted as the impacts of strengthening vertical wind shear caused the eyewall to become eroded later into the day. Bongoyo maintained its strength, although the overall structure of the storm became increasingly vertically tilted. On 18:00 UTC on 9 December, Bongoyo finally weakened back down to a moderate tropical storm after maintaining its strength for over a day while convection became sheared away from the circulation. Bongoyo soon began its westward turn on 10 December as it began to ride along the southern edge of a subtropical ridge, and it became a remnant low early on 11 December as all convection sheared away from the low level circulation, thus the last advisory was issued by both MFR and the JTWC.

=== Severe Tropical Storm Chalane ===
- Severe tropical storm (MFR)
- Category 1 tropical cyclone (SSHWS)
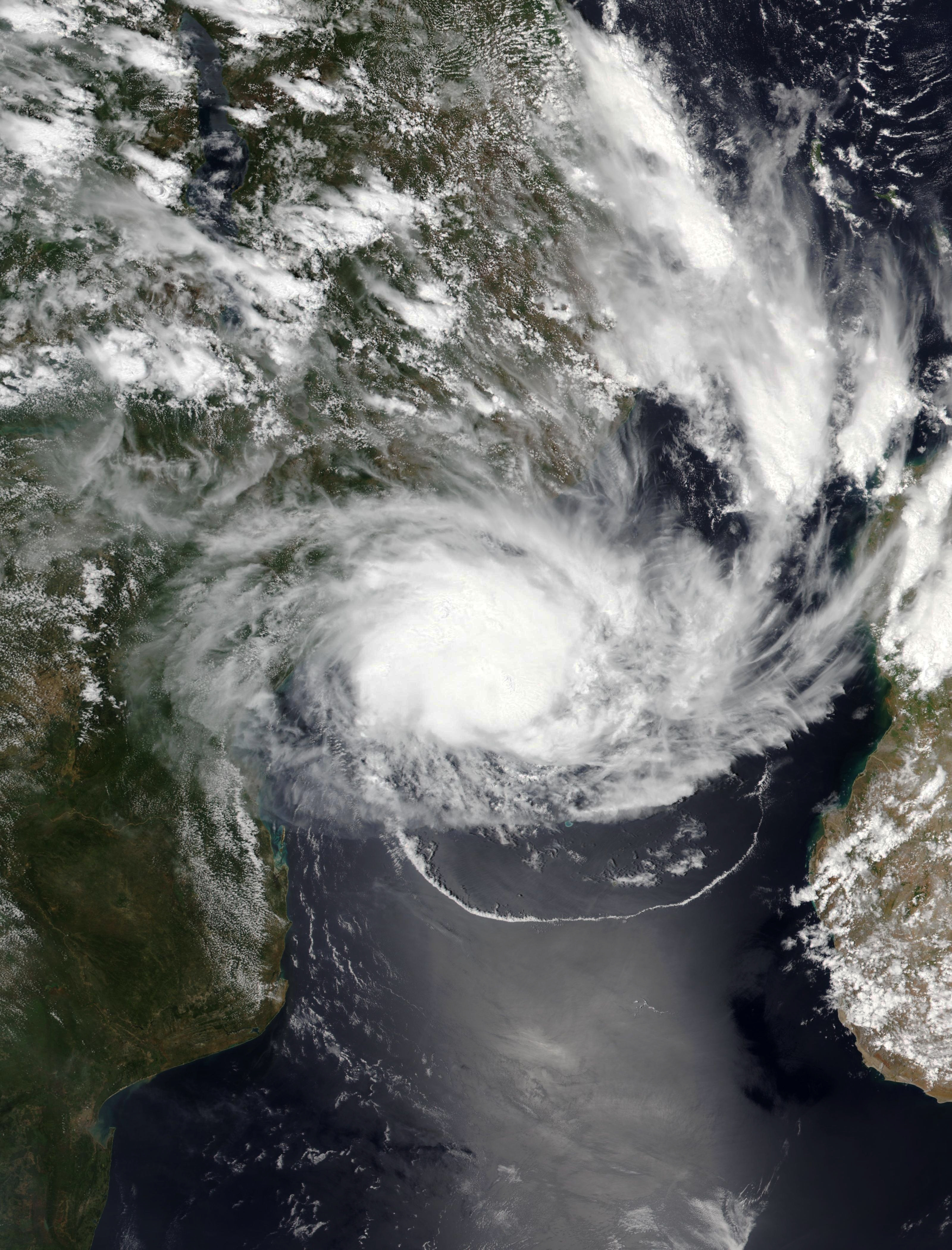
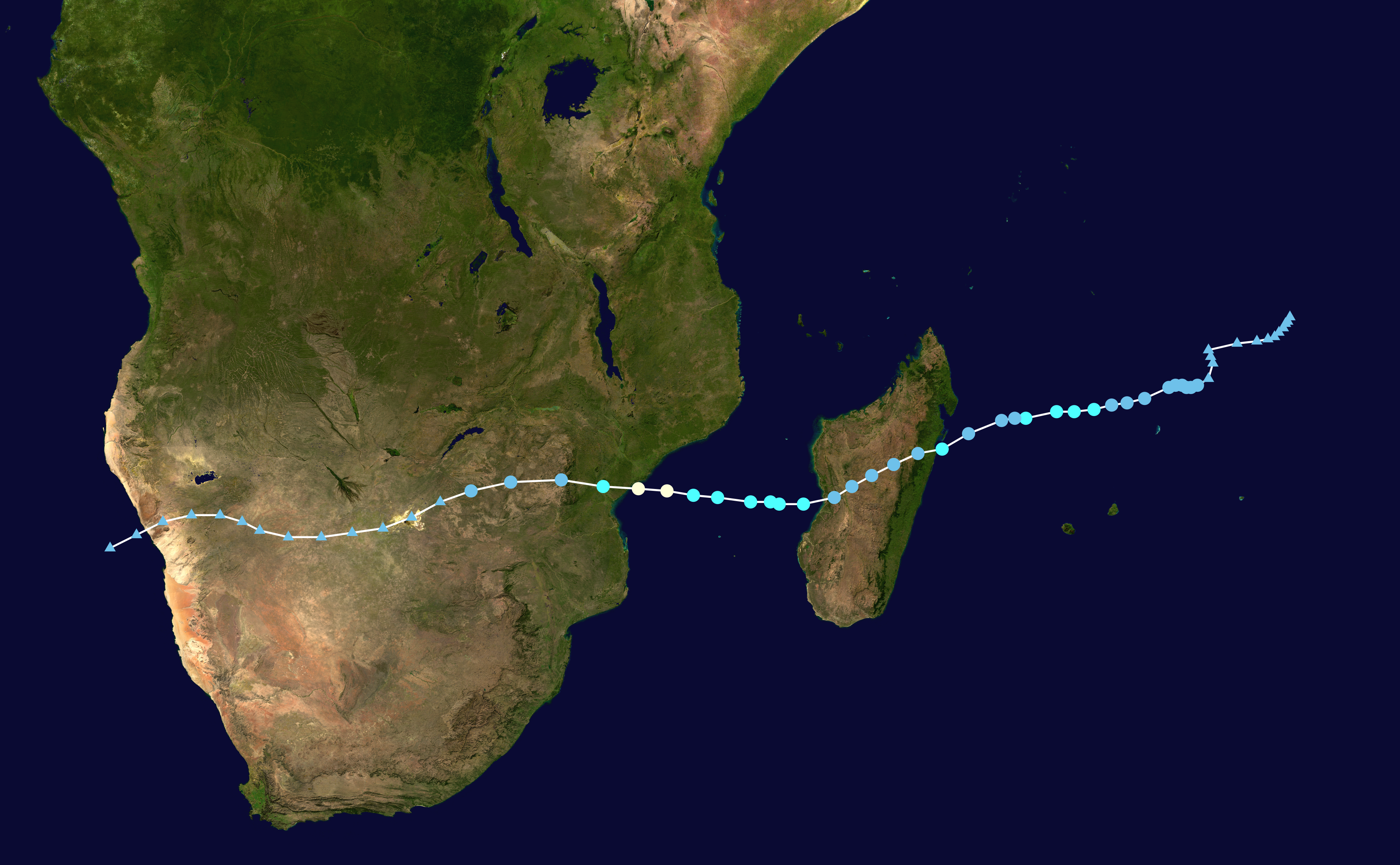
- Duration: 19 December – 30 December
- Peak intensity: 110 km/h (70 mph) (10-min); 975 hPa (mbar)

On 19 December, RSMC La Réunion began monitoring a zone of disturbed weather situated approximately 830 km (515 mi) southwest of Diego Garcia. The system was located in a favourable environment for intensification due to the presence of a Kelvin wave and an equatorial Rossby wave, as well as warm sea surface temperatures, low to moderate vertical wind shear and good upper-level outflow. Conditions began to somewhat deteriorate over the next several days as the system meandered to the west, but the storm still managed to reach tropical depression status on 23 December, as northerly wind shear began to affect the storm, causing most of the thunderstorm activity and winds to be localized to the south of the center. Approximately a day later, at 06:00 UTC 24 December, the depression had strengthened to Moderate Tropical Storm Chalane as a scatterometer pass revealed gale-force winds on the southern side of the highly asymmetric wind field. Chalane began to strengthen, with winds reaching 75 km/h (45 mph), as wind shear decreased due to storm becoming aligned with the subtropical ridge. Around the same time, the Joint Typhoon Warning Center issued a Tropical Cyclone Formation Alert. At 21:00 UTC that day, the JTWC designated Chalane as Tropical Storm 07S.

Chalane, however, continued to struggle from the effects of strong north-northeasterly wind shear. Chalane passed just to the south of Tromelin Island on 25 December where a pressure reading of 1001.5 hPa (29.57 inHg) was recorded, indicating Chalane had likely weakened while also displaying a deteriorating cloud pattern, thus Chalane was downgraded back to tropical depression status on 18:00 UTC that day. Chalane continued westward, although slowly, towards the Malagasy coastline as a tropical depression. Convective activity remained disorganized while the center accelerated west up to landfall on 26 December at 18:00 UTC in Mahavelona, Madagascar. Chalane degenerated into a surface trough shortly afterwards on 27 December, although its center still remained intact. MFR stopped advisories at this time, as re-intensification was uncertain. Chalane made its passage over Madagascar for the remainder of the day, before emerging over the Mozambique Channel on 28 December where advisories resumed and Chalane re-developed into a tropical depression. 6 hours later, Chalane gained moderate tropical storm strength yet again with the development of a curved band. Chalane continued to strengthen over the channel with a central dense overcast bundled with the curved band becoming apparent on satellite imagery and Chalane gained severe tropical storm status at 06:00 UTC on 29 December alongside the formation of an eyewall. Chalane continued to slowly gain strength while in its favorable environment, gaining peak strength 12 hours later with maximum sustained winds of 110 km/h (70 mph) and a pressure of 983 hPa (29.03 inHg). Shortly after peaking, Chalane made landfall north of Beira, Mozambique on 30 December and became subject to weakening due to land interaction. Chalane degenerated into a remnant low later that day over Zimbabwe as all organized thunderstorm activity had ceased, and the final advisory was then issued by MFR.

203 mm (7.99 in) of rain fell in Toamasina in just 24 hours due to Chalane. Damage was relatively isolated, although electricity poles were knocked out however, the flooding was less severe than previously anticipated.

=== Tropical Depression 05 ===
- Tropical depression (MFR)
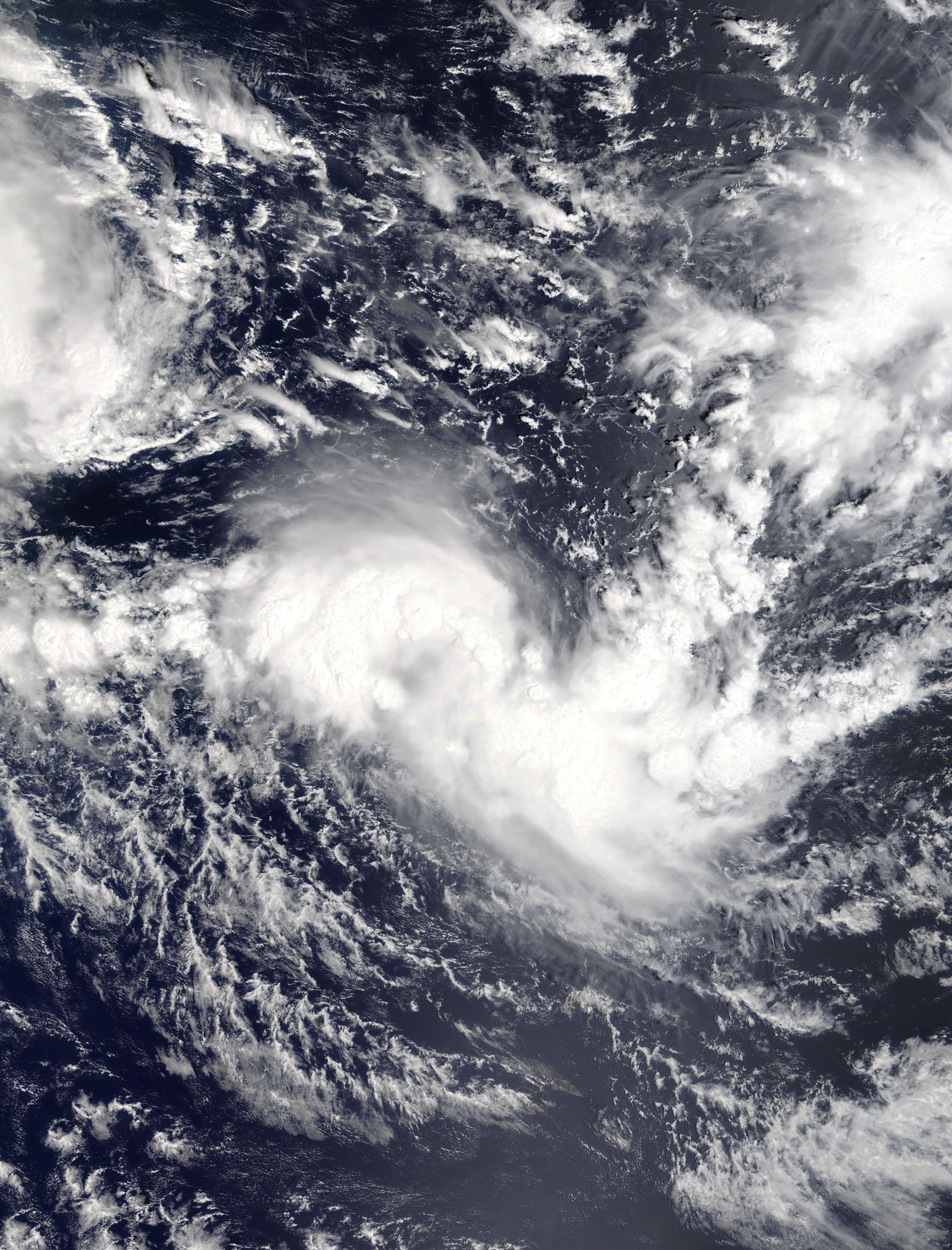
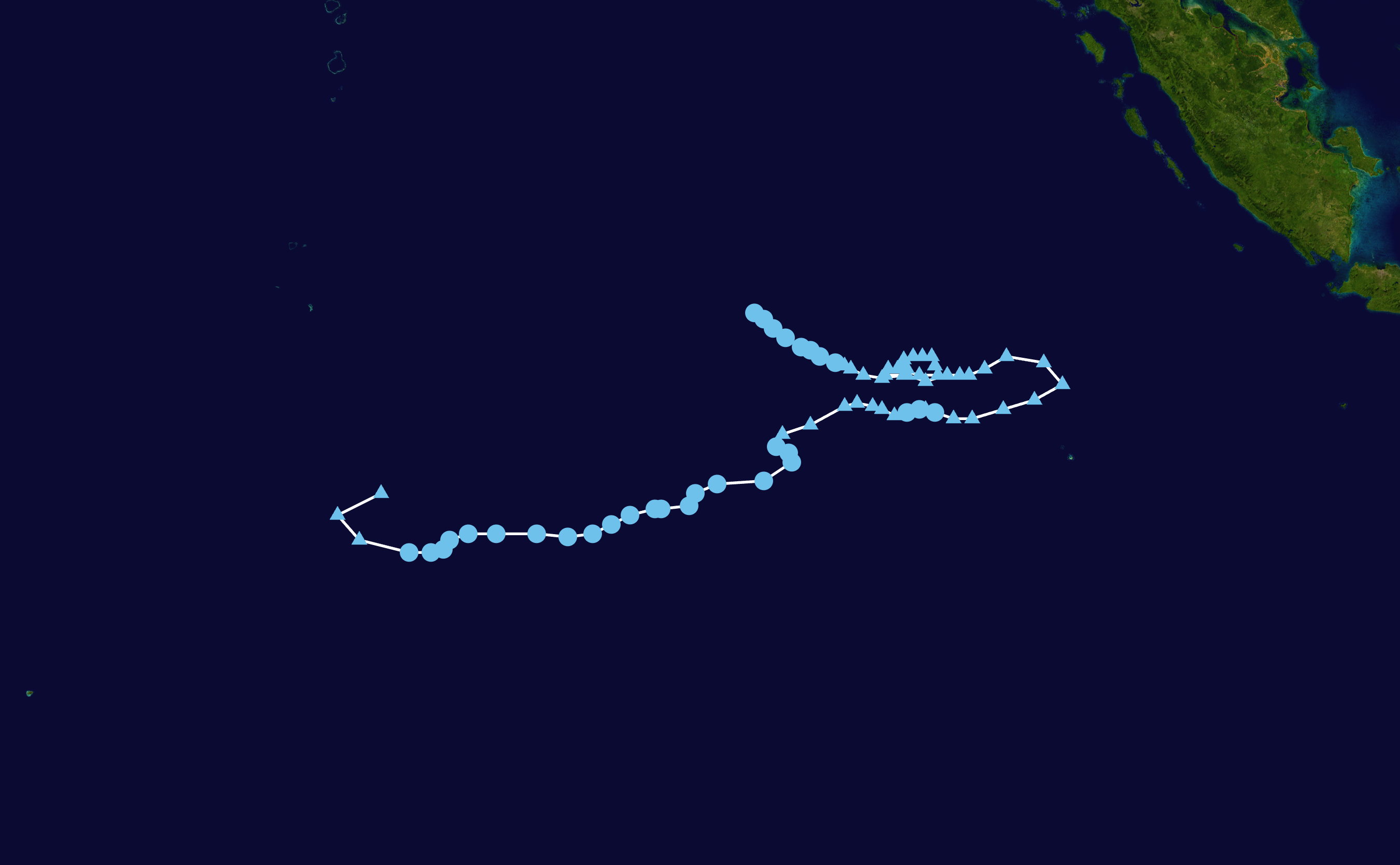
- Duration: 28 December (Entered basin) – 3 January
- Peak intensity: 55 km/h (35 mph) (10-min); 998 hPa (mbar)

On 17 December, RSMC La Réunion began monitoring a sheared low-pressure area located in the far northeastern corner of the basin, about 1,250 km (775 mi) west-northwest of the Cocos Islands. The system began moving slowly towards the southeast, and on the following day it was classified as a tropical disturbance by RSMC La Réunion. At the time, the system's central atmospheric pressure was estimated at 1005 hPa (29.68 inHg) and satellite scatterometer data from just after 02:00 UTC on 18 December indicated maximum 10-minute sustained winds of up to 55 km/h (35 mph) in the disturbance's northern semicircle. Environmental conditions were assessed as being marginally conducive for tropical cyclogenesis, with warm sea surface temperatures near 30 °C (86 °F) and low vertical wind shear, but only weak outflow in the upper troposphere. The tropical disturbance crossed into the Australian region by 20 December, where it was classified as Tropical Low 04U by the Australian Bureau of Meteorology. After meandering outside the basin for several days, the system re-entered the MFR's area of responsibility as a zone of disturbed weather on 28 December, before being upgraded to Tropical Depression 05 on 31 December. However, the system was unable to intensify significantly, due to the outflow from Severe Tropical Storm Danilo to the northwest. On 2 January, Tropical Depression 05 began undergoing a Fujiwhara interaction with Danilo, before merging into the stronger system on 3 January.

=== Severe Tropical Storm Danilo ===
- Severe tropical storm (MFR)
- Tropical storm (SSHWS)
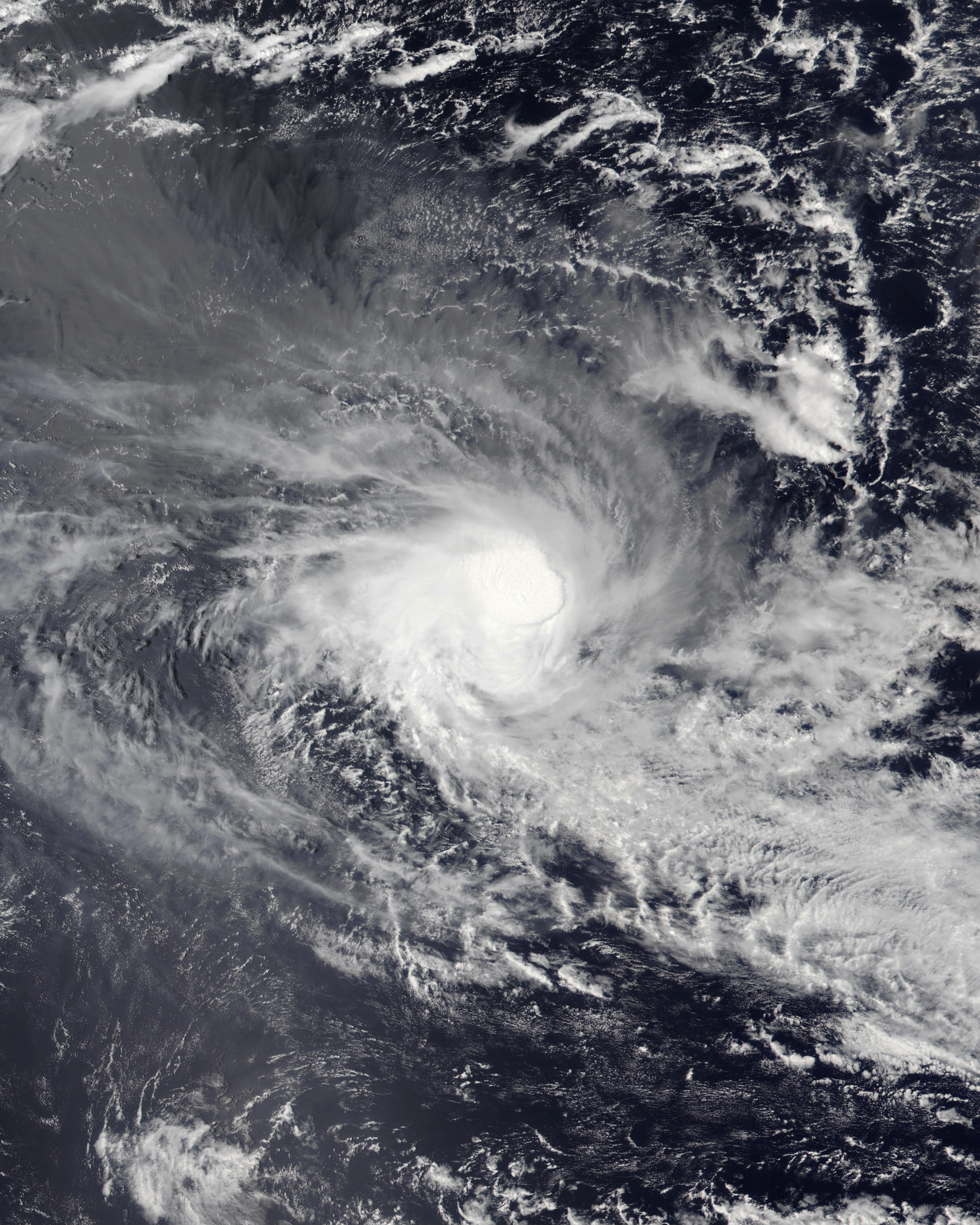
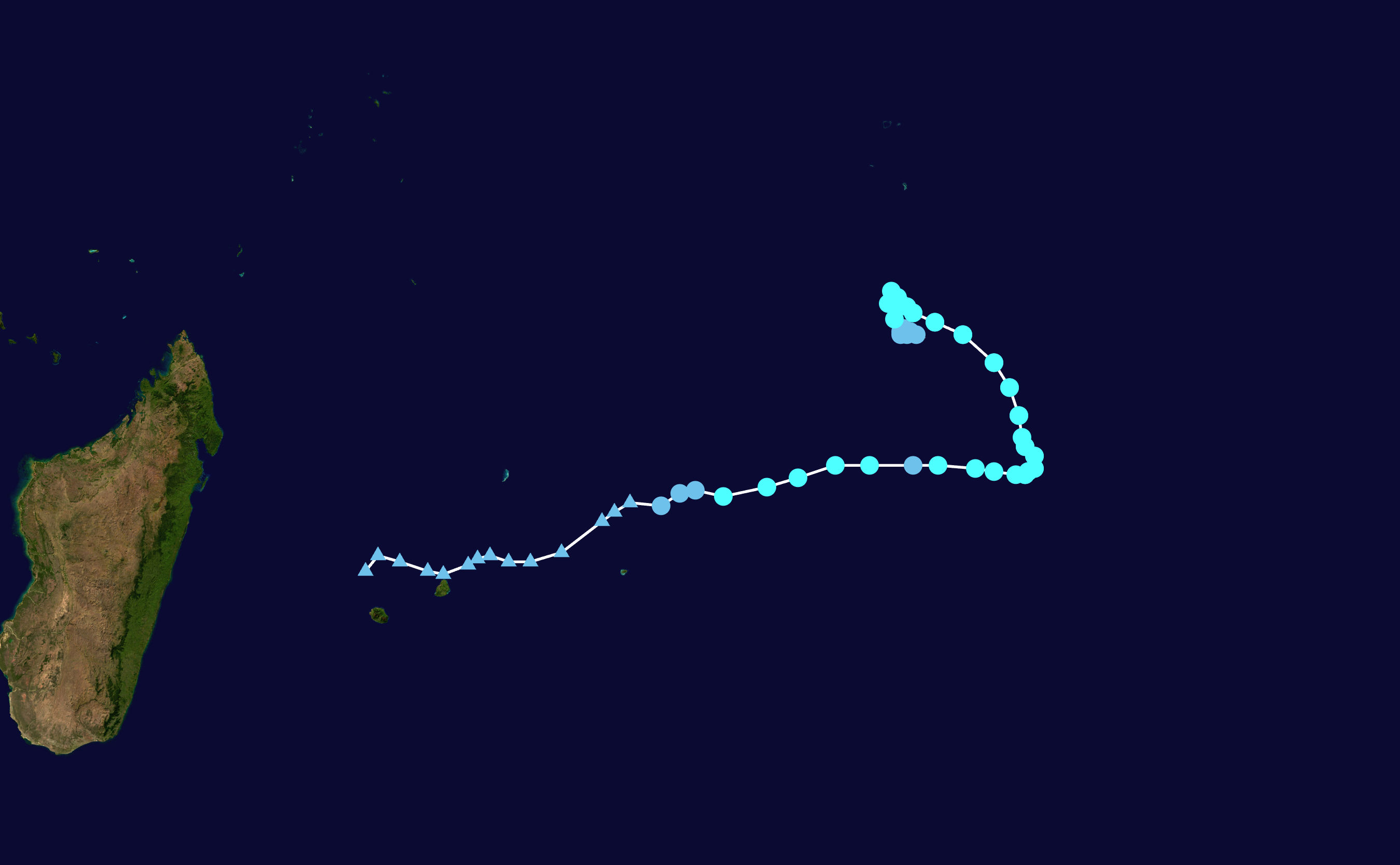
- Duration: 28 December – 12 January
- Peak intensity: 100 km/h (65 mph) (10-min); 982 hPa (mbar)

On 28 December, a Zone of Disturbed Weather formed near the Chagos Archipelago. It gradually organized over a sheared but moist environment for the next several days before eventually strengthening into Moderate Tropical Storm Danilo at 12:00 UTC 1 January. As Danilo tracked north, it continued to strengthen with the appearance of very deep convection and a mid-level eye feature becoming apparent by the next day. Around this time, Danilo began a fujiwhara interaction with Tropical Depression 05 to the east. The storm reached its initial peak intensity with sustained winds of 110 km/h (70 mph) on 3 January with the development of a well-defined central dense overcast. Around the time of reaching peak strength, Danilo continued to absorb what remained of Tropical Depression 05, which was inflicting some southeasterly wind shear on the storm. The interaction between the two systems caused Danilo to rapidly weaken back to moderate tropical storm strength on 06:00 UTC 4 January. Danilo re-strengthened by the end of the day as 05 had been completely absorbed, regaining severe tropical storm strength at 06:00 UTC 5 January under an improvement in surrounding environment conditions peaking with winds of 100 km/h (60 mph) and a pressure of 981 hPa. A sudden increase in northerly shear, lack of outflow, and an interaction with the subtropical jet caused Danilo to take a sharp turn to the west and weaken to a moderate tropical storm. Danilo displayed a highly sheared pattern by 5 January and failed to retain any long-lasting bursts of convection as much of the thunderstorm activity became sheared to the south. Danilo fell to tropical depression status later that day. The persisting storm maintained a westward track, becoming a remnant low on 9 January with a fully exposed circulation on approach to the Mascarene Islands. Danilo passed north of Mauritius as a dissipating system on 11 January before the system was last noted on 12 January.

=== Tropical Cyclone Eloise ===
- Tropical cyclone (MFR)
- Category 2 tropical cyclone (SSHWS)
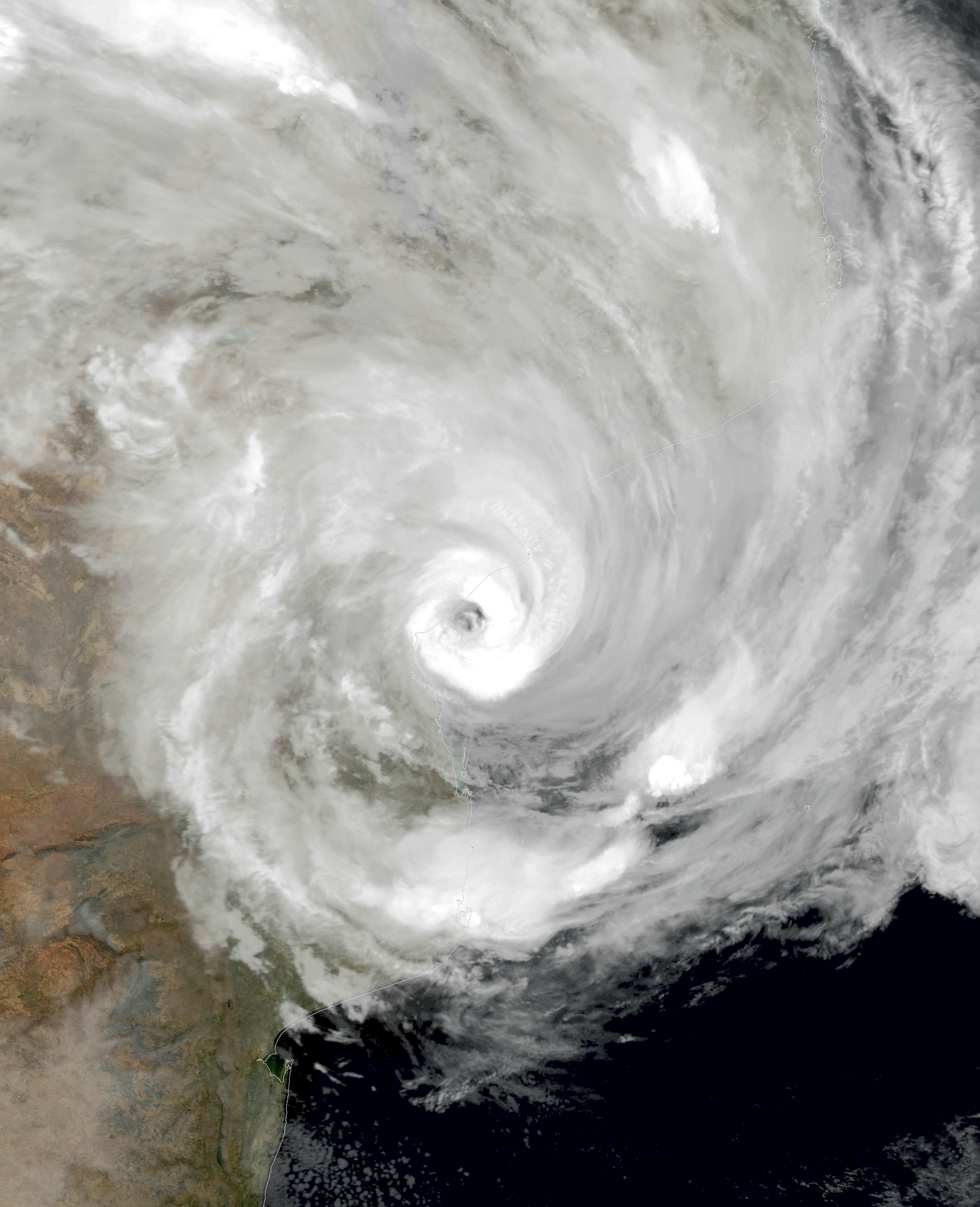
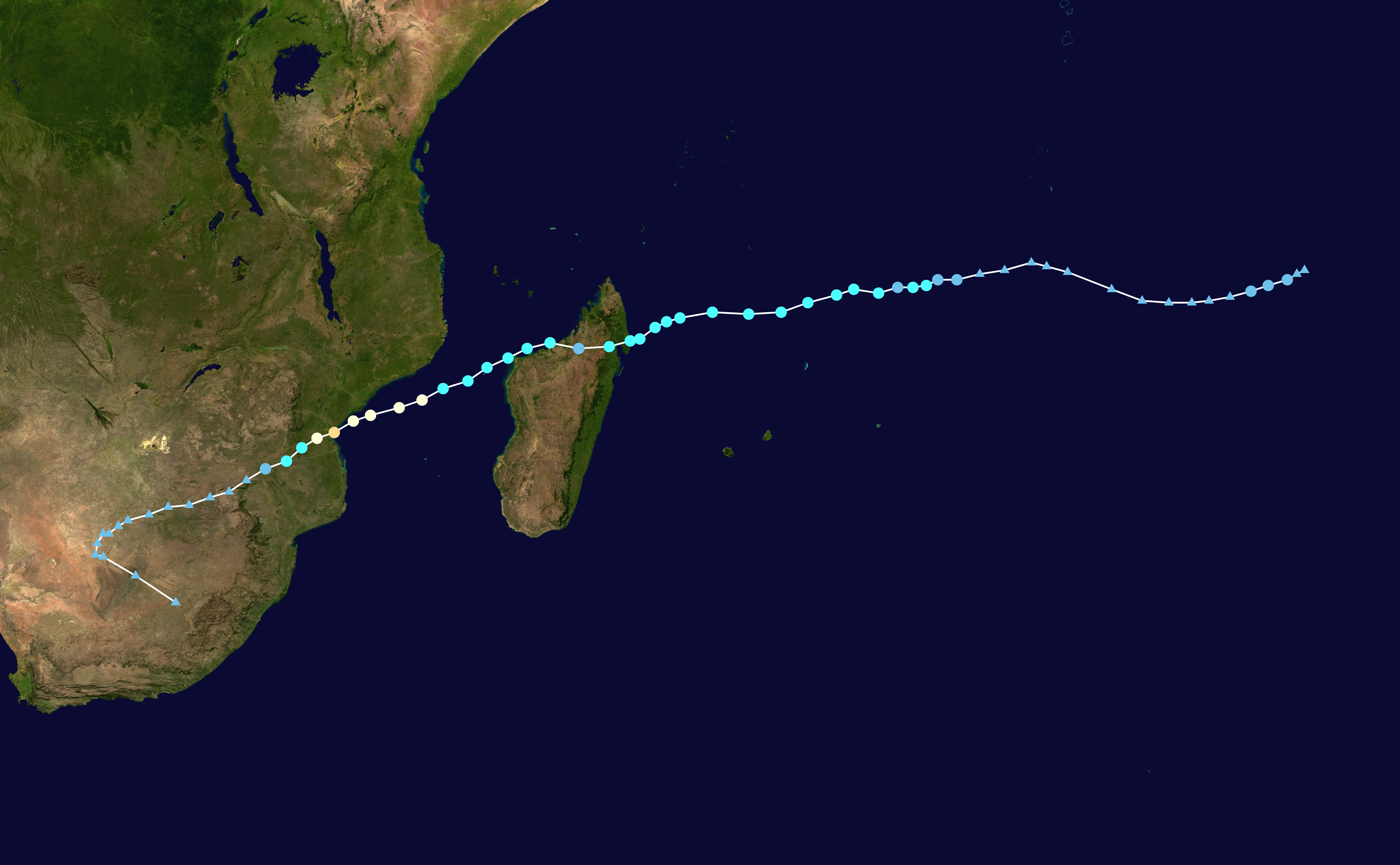
- Duration: 14 January – 25 January
- Peak intensity: 150 km/h (90 mph) (10-min); 965 hPa (mbar)

On 14 January, a zone of disturbed weather formed over the central South Indian Ocean to the east of another system while gradually organizing and moving westward. On 16 January, the system organized into a tropical depression. With the presence of persisting deep convection, the system strengthened into Moderate Tropical Storm Eloise on 17 January. Initially, Eloise struggled to develop further due to the presence of strong easterly shear and dry air, which caused Eloise's thunderstorm activity to be displaced to the west. Despite the presence of this shear and mid-level dry air, Eloise continued to intensify further, with convection wrapping into an eye feature and outflow becoming increasingly defined, marking the intensification of Eloise into a severe tropical storm on 19 January, while heading westward towards Madagascar. This intensification trend did not last for a particularly long time, as Eloise made a small turn to the north and then made landfall in Antalaha, Madagascar, whilst weakening back to a moderate tropical storm, due to land interaction with the mountains of Madagascar. The next day, Eloise weakened due to land interaction, with deep convection over its center eroded, though it maintained flaring convection over the northern semicircle.

On 20 January, Eloise emerged into the Mozambique Channel, where Eloise began to slowly reintensify with warm waters, a moist environment, weak shear but weak divergence contributing to the storm's slow strengthening trend. However, some upper-level convergence hindered convection from developing quickly, though all other factors were relatively favorable. Soon afterward, the upper-level convergence began to decrease, allowing the system to strengthen more rapidly. Eloise strengthened further with well defined rainbands wrapping into a small eye, marking its intensification into a tropical cyclone. Early on 23 January, Eloise continued the quick intensification trend and peaked as a Category 2-equivalent tropical cyclone on the Saffir–Simpson scale with 10-minute sustained winds of 150 km/h (95 mph), 1-minute sustained winds of 165 km/h (105 mph), and a minimum central pressure of 967 millibars (28.6 inHg), as the storm's eyewall began moving ashore. Soon afterward, Eloise made landfall just north of Beira, Mozambique, at the same intensity. As the storm moved further inland Eloise weakened rapidly due to interaction with the rugged terrain and dry air. Later that day, Eloise weakened into a tropical depression as it tracked further inland, and on 25 January, Eloise degenerated into a remnant low. The MFR then issued their final advisory on the system.

=== Severe Tropical Storm Joshua ===
- Severe tropical storm (MFR)
- Tropical storm (SSHWS)
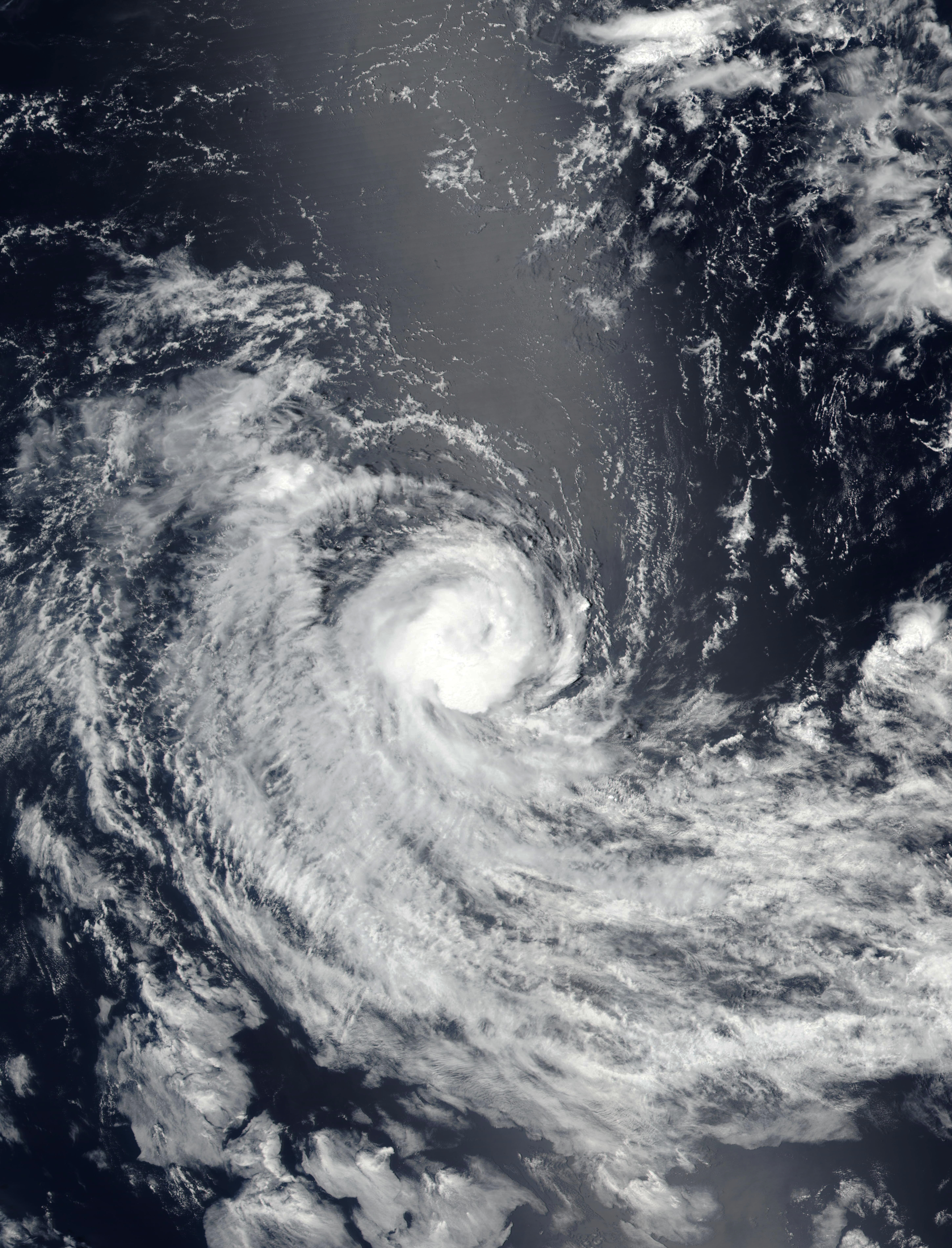
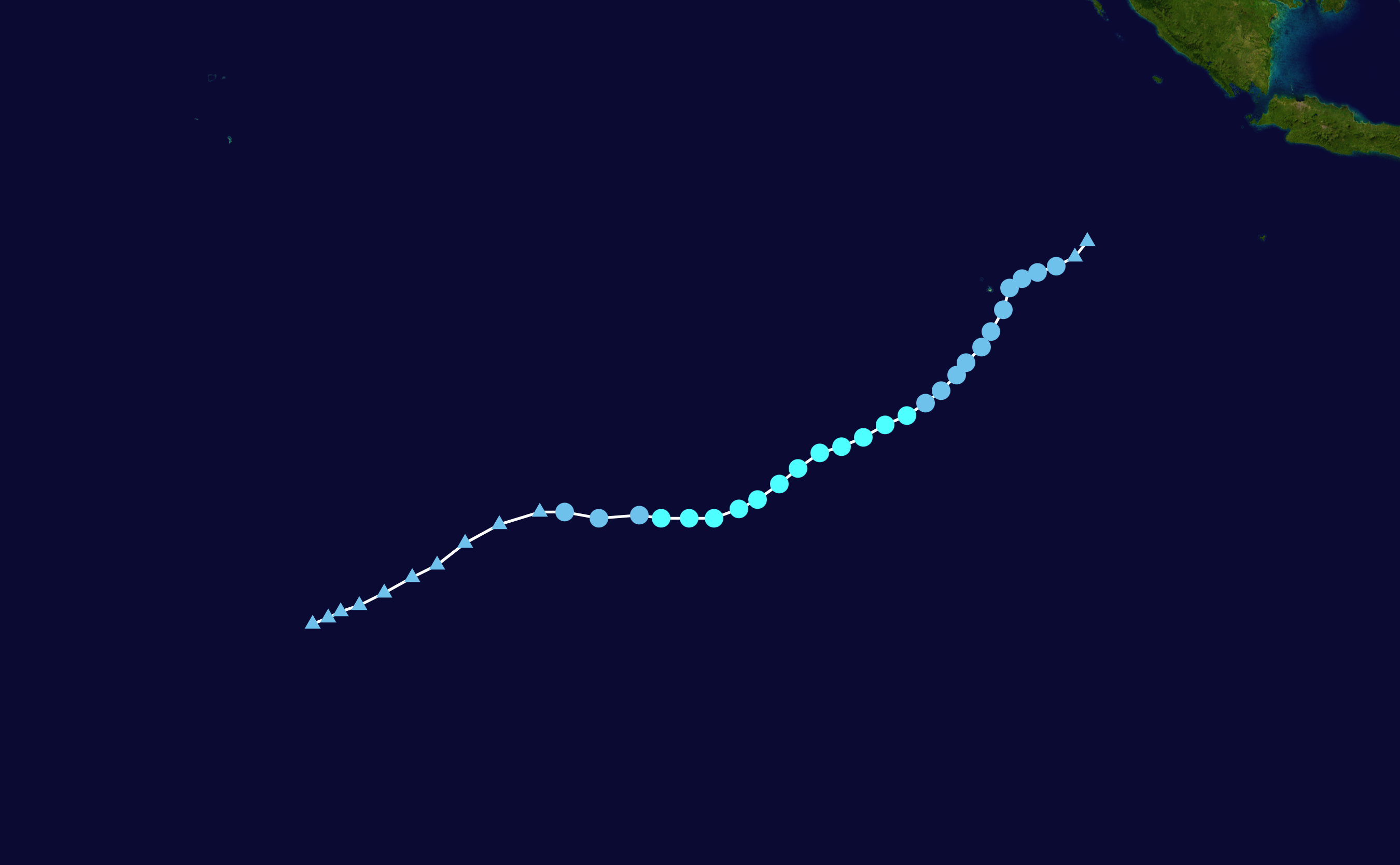
- Duration: 17 January (Entered basin) – 19 January
- Peak intensity: 95 km/h (60 mph) (10-min); 988 hPa (mbar)

On 16 January, Météo-France La Réunion (MFR) first noted the presence of a tropical low in the Australian region which was expected to strengthen as it passed 90°E into the South-West Indian Ocean. On 17 January, the system, which had become Tropical Cyclone Joshua the previous day, crossed into the MFR's area of responsibility (AOR). Joshua's convection fluctuated on 18 January, but the storm held onto moderate tropical storm status. However, Joshua soon entered an even more hostile environment with lots of dry air and high wind shear, causing Joshua's thunderstorms to rapidly dissipate; Joshua weakened to tropical depression status the next day. By 18:00 UTC 19 January, the Joint Typhoon Warning Center (JTWC) and MFR both issued their final warning on Joshua.

=== Tropical Depression 09 ===
- Tropical depression (MFR)
- Tropical depression (SSHWS)
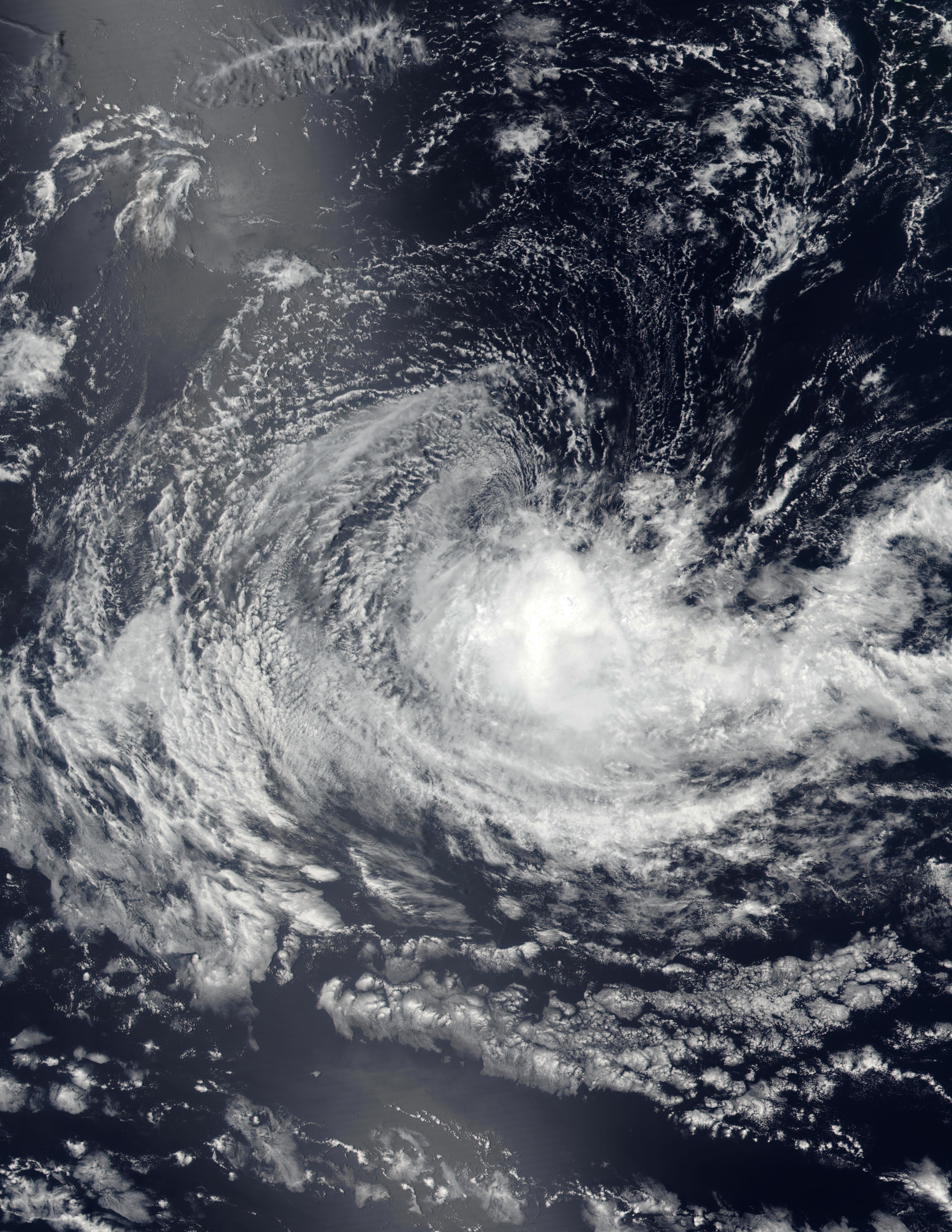
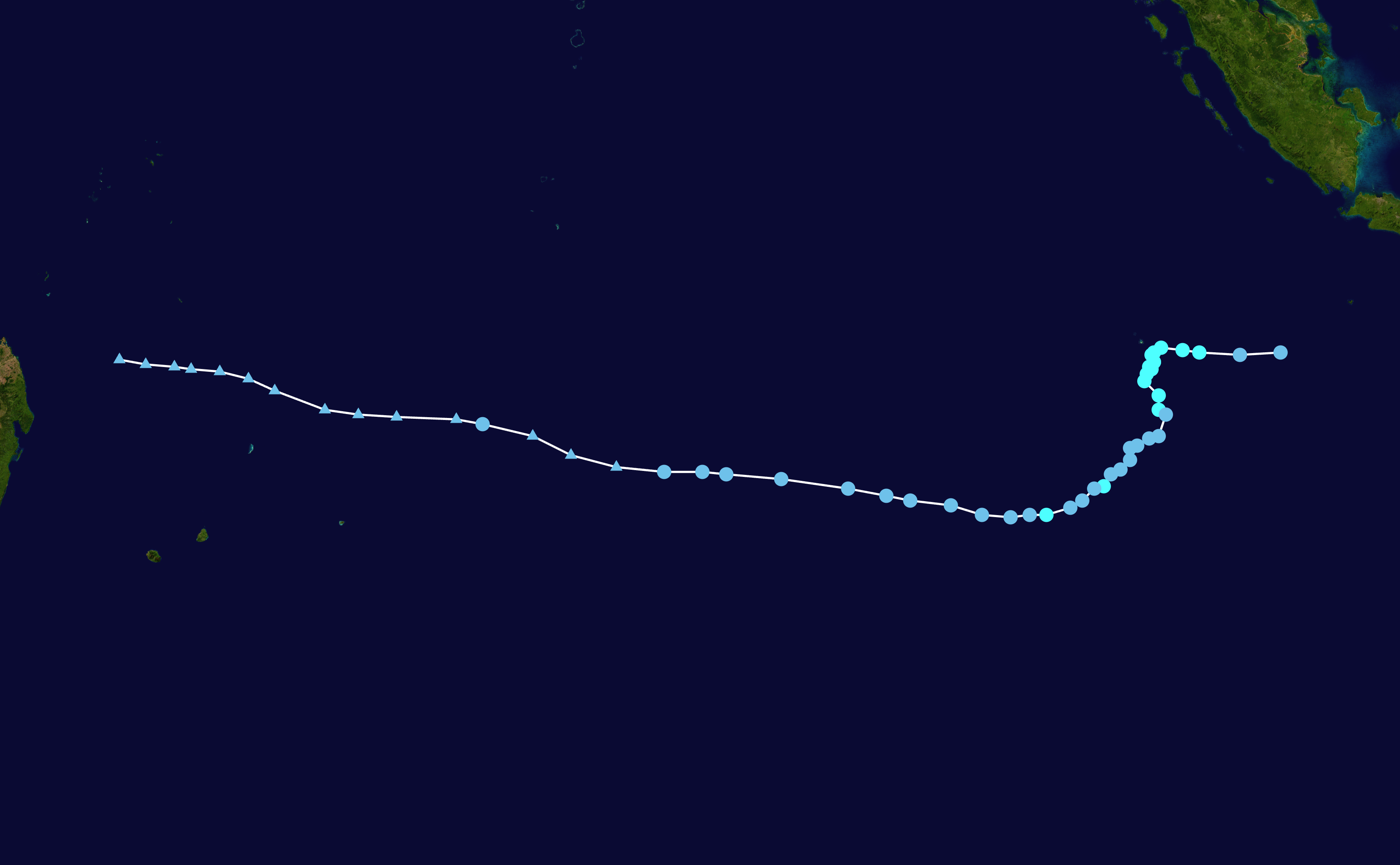
- Duration: 27 January (Entered basin) – 28 January
- Peak intensity: 55 km/h (35 mph) (10-min); 1001 hPa (mbar)

On 27 January, Tropical Low 10U from the Australian region entered the basin was designated as Tropical Depression 09. Moving through a very hostile environment with dry air and high wind shear, the system struggled to maintain its strength with a mostly exposed circulation and only weak convection over the south side of the system. A short time after entering the basin, Météo-France La Réunion (MFR) issued their last warning on 12:00 UTC 28 January as the system had become highly disorganized.

=== Very Intense Tropical Cyclone Faraji ===
- Very intense tropical cyclone (MFR)
- Category 5 tropical cyclone (SSHWS)
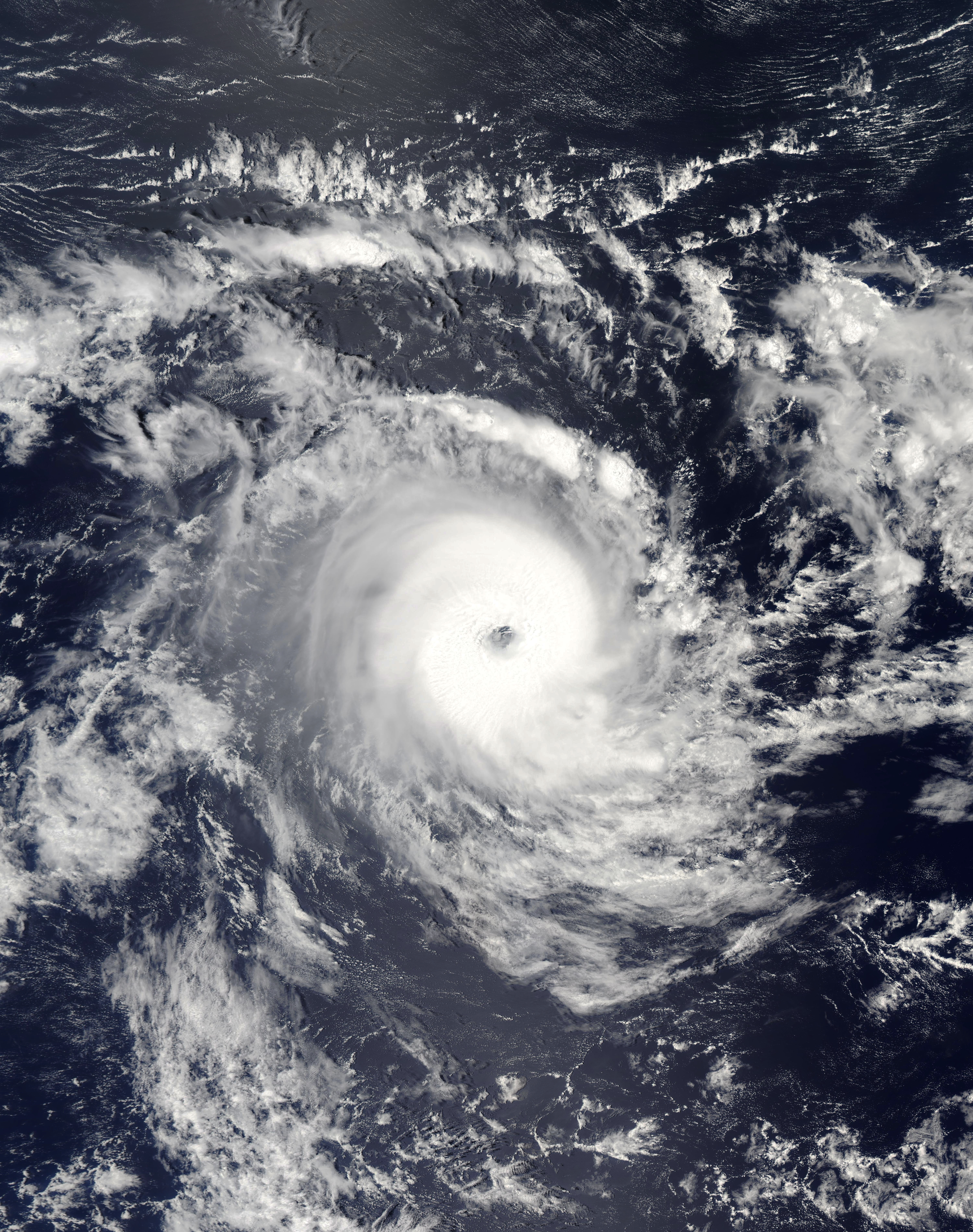
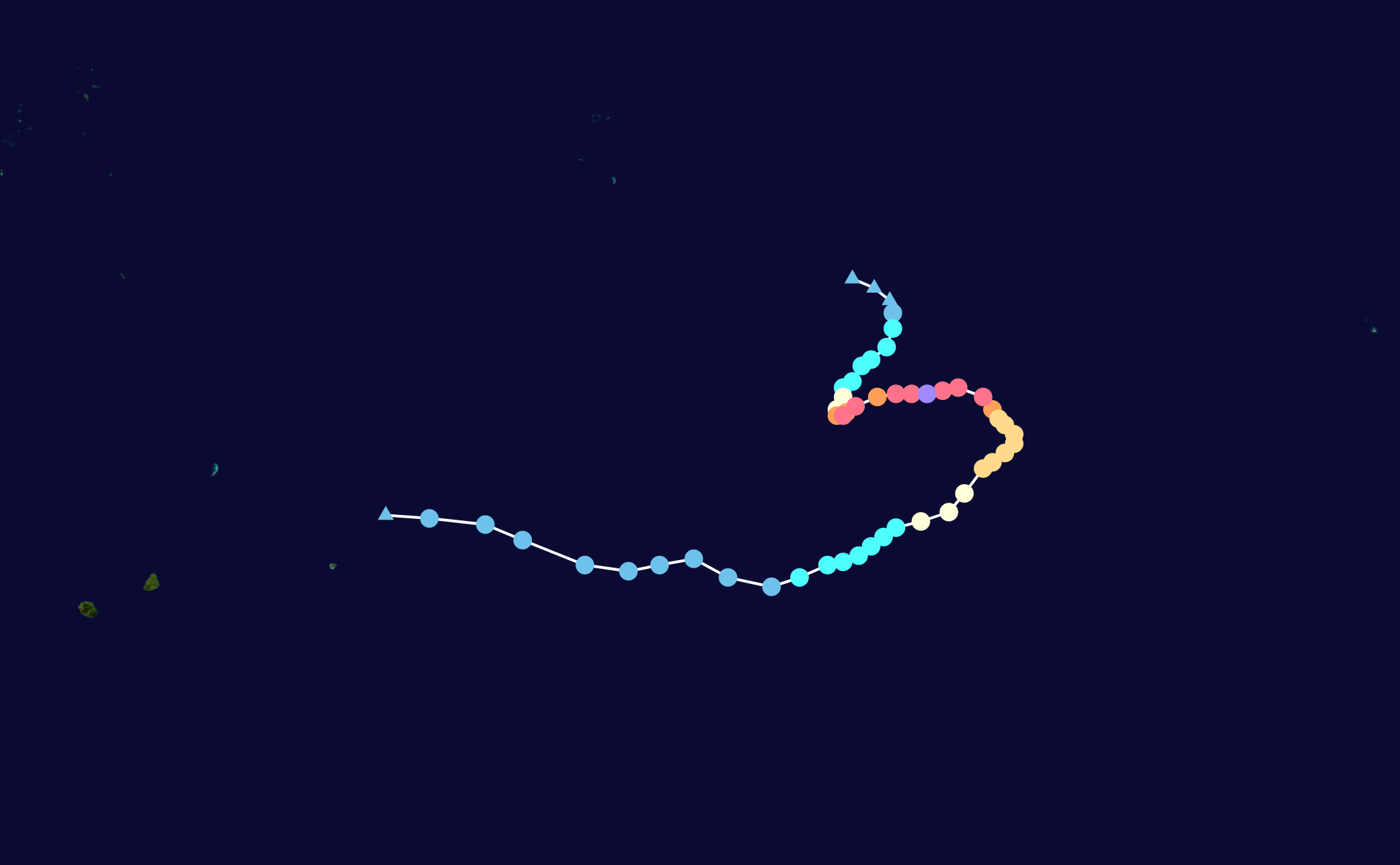
- Duration: 4 February – 13 February
- Peak intensity: 220 km/h (140 mph) (10-min); 935 hPa (mbar)

Early on 4 February, MFR began to track a well-defined surface circulation developing southeast of the Chagos Archipelago. Initially only in a moderately favorable environment, the disturbance unexpectedly and rapidly developed into a tropical depression 18 hours later. The Joint Typhoon Warning Center (JTWC) also issued their first warning on the system as Tropical Cyclone 19S at 09:00 UTC that day. The depression further intensified into Moderate Tropical Storm Faraji at 12:00 UTC on 5 February. The storm had an intense band of intense deep convection wrapping in from the western side to the northern side whilst rapidly consolidating. Afterward, Faraji began its first rapid intensification with a well-defined core structure developing throughout the day, marking the storm's intensification to severe tropical storm strength early on 6 February. Soon afterward, Faraji developed a pinhole eye as it continued to intensify, becoming a tropical cyclone several hours later. The cyclone's eye quickly became more pronounced on infrared satellite imagery while Faraji drifted over waters with high ocean heat content, and low vertical wind shear, indicating more strengthening had occurred. Faraji remained in a state of rapid intensification, and at 06:00 UTC 7 February Faraji became the first intense tropical cyclone of the season, with a clear, well-defined eye surrounded by deep, persisting convection as the cyclone began to slow down significantly. At this time, the JTWC upgraded Faraji to a Category 4-equivalent tropical cyclone, with 1-minute sustained winds at 215 km/h (135 mph).

For the next several hours, Faraji maintained its structure even as its cloud tops slightly warmed. Afterward, Faraji began to slowly weaken, although the storm still remained an intense tropical cyclone. However, after accelerating eastward away from cooler sea surface temperatures caused by upwelling, Faraji quickly strengthened once again on 8 February. Around this time, the storm's structure became more compact. Later that day, Faraji became a very intense tropical cyclone, with a minimum central pressure of 925 hPa (27.31 inHg) and 10-minute sustained winds of 230 km/h (145 mph). Around the same time, the JTWC also assessed Faraji as having 1-minute maximum sustained winds of 260 km/h (160 mph), making the storm a Category 5-equivalent tropical cyclone on the Saffir–Simpson scale (SSHWS), with the JTWC citing a very well-defined eye and the typical characteristics of an annular tropical cyclone. However, Faraji began to weaken as it turned south due to limited outflow, with the eye collapsing completely by the next day. Faraji's structure waxed and waned with the reappearance of the eye while conditions were modestly favorable. By 11 February, Faraji had once again been significantly weakened past its peak strength. Faraji weakened to a moderate tropical storm as it slowly headed southwest, displaying a typical sheared satellite appearance early on 13 February. The last warning on Faraji was issued by MFR at 12:00 UTC that day, followed by the JTWC at 09:00 UTC on the following day. However, the JTWC tracked Faraji's remnant low westward for another few days, before it dissipated on 16 February.

=== Tropical Cyclone Guambe ===
- Tropical cyclone (MFR)
- Category 2 tropical cyclone (SSHWS)
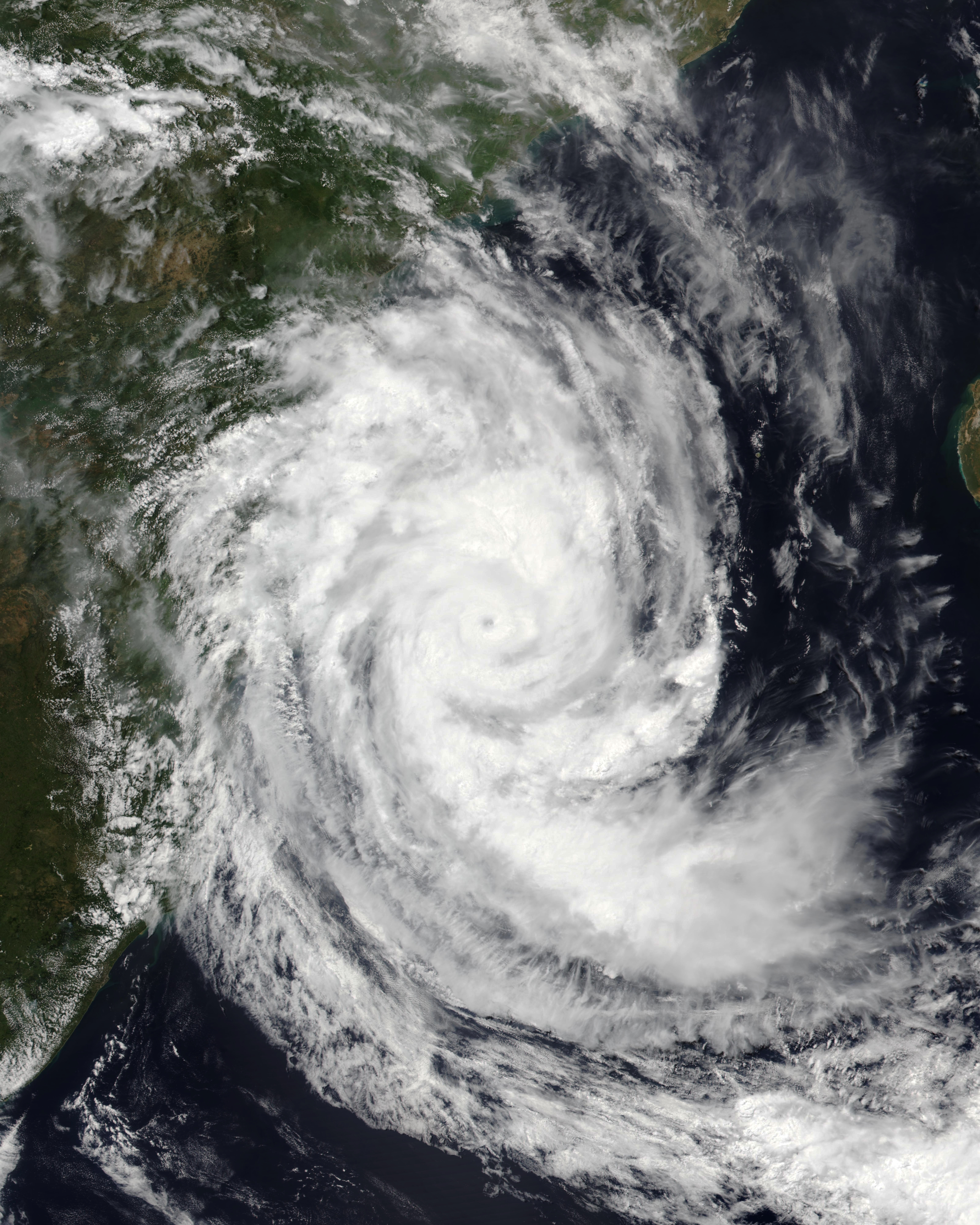
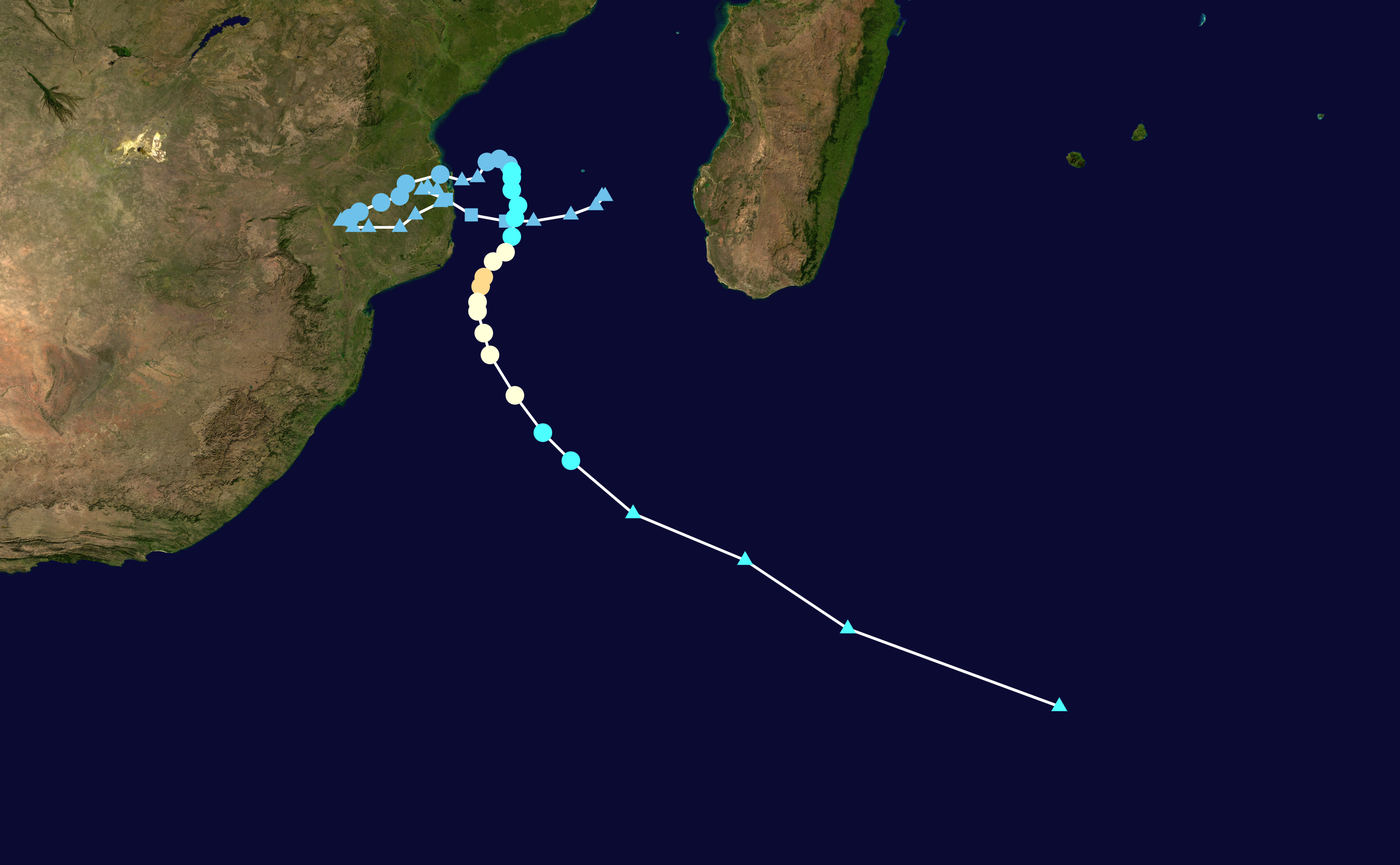
- Duration: 10 February – 22 February
- Peak intensity: 150 km/h (90 mph) (10-min); 957 hPa (mbar)

On 10 February, a disturbance developed off the coast of Mozambique. On 12 February, Météo-France La Réunion noted that the system had transitioned into a subtropical depression and had made landfall near Inhambane, Mozambique. The storm was also slowly moving inland, without having developed any sustained convection. The next day, the system was designated as an overland tropical depression, while bringing locally heavy rainfall across areas of southern Mozambique. For the next few days, the system made a slow clockwise loop over Mozambique, while slowly organizing. By 15 February, the meandering system had turned back eastward and was expected to re-emerge into the Mozambique Channel. At 06:00 UTC on 16 February, the system re-emerged over warm open water and was designated as Tropical Disturbance 11. The storm continued organizing, and at 18:00 UTC that day, MFR upgraded the system to a tropical depression. On 17 February, the depression strengthened into Moderate Tropical Storm Guambe at 12:00 UTC that day, with the northern section of the storm becoming enveloped in deep convection.

The storm continued strengthening into the next day, as thunderstorm activity became more localized around the center of the storm's circulation; however, the lack of level convergence was initially limiting any significant intensification. Despite this, Guambe strengthened into a severe tropical storm at 18:00 UTC on 18 February. Over the next several hours, Guambe began undergoing rapid intensification, with a well-defined central dense overcast configuration developing, as the cyclone continued organizing. Guambe quickly reached tropical cyclone status at 06:00 UTC on 19 February, with the appearance of a very small eye on infrared satellite imagery and a well-defined core structure. At this time, JTWC estimated that Guambe had strengthened into a Category 2-equivalent tropical cyclone, with 1-minute sustained winds at 155 km/h (95 mph). Guambe's motion slowed as it held onto its strength, with the storm's eye occasionally re-appearing alongside sporadic bursts of convection. Despite forecasts of further strengthening, Guambe rapidly weakened back down to severe tropical storm status on 20 February due to an eyewall replacement cycle. Guambe's structure began to evolve into a curved band by the next day while it gradually accelerated southeast, with most of the thunderstorms becoming displaced to the east of the center. Soon afterward, Guambe's structure decayed further with the rainbands unraveling and warming cloud tops, caused by high wind shear and cool sea surface temperatures. Guambe became a post-tropical low later on 21 February, as it began undergoing extratropical transition. On 22 February, the MFR issued their last advisory on the storm as it completed its extratropical transition and began interacting with the southern jet stream.

=== Tropical Cyclone Marian ===
- Tropical cyclone (MFR)
- Category 2 tropical cyclone (SSHWS)
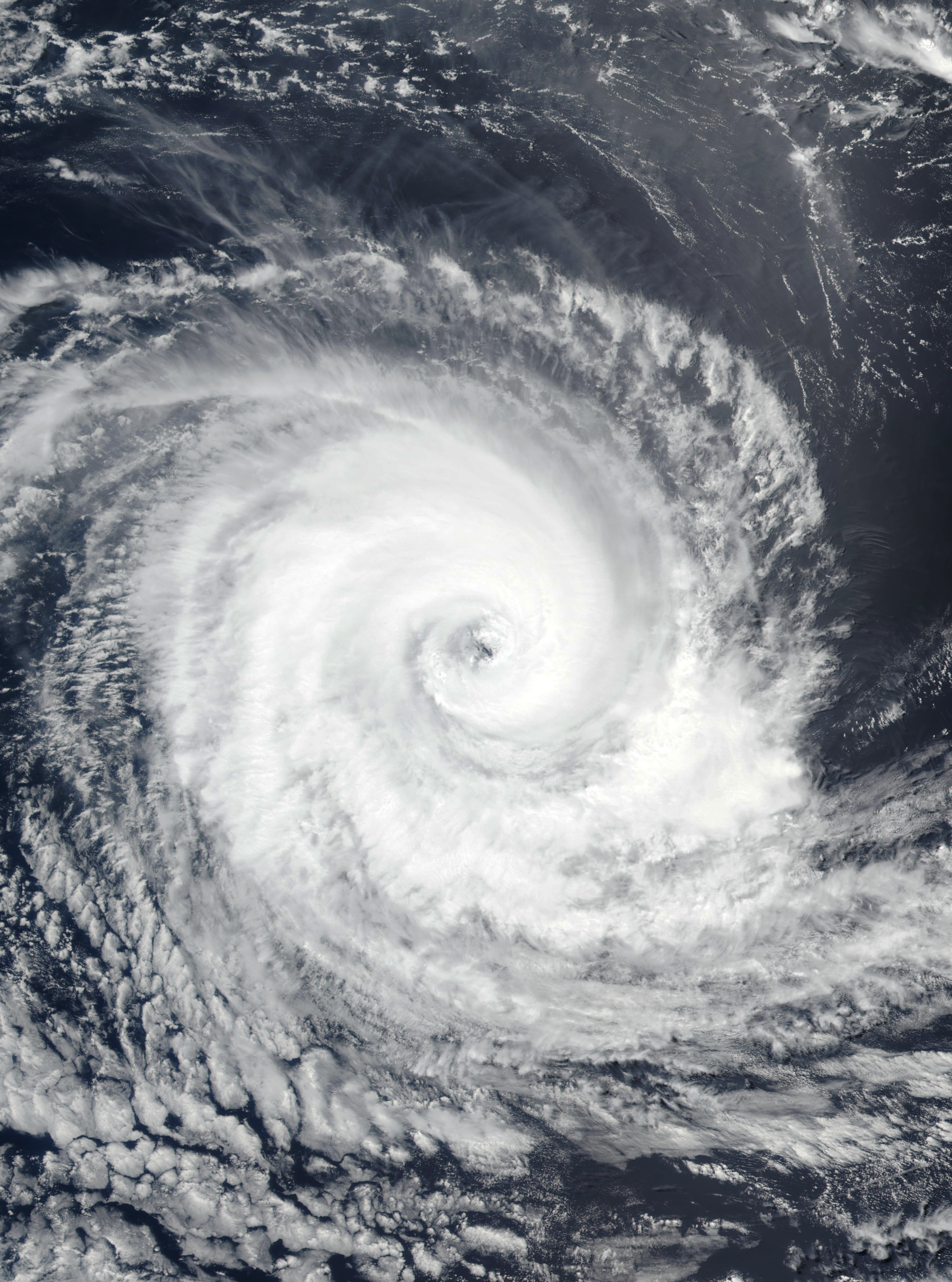
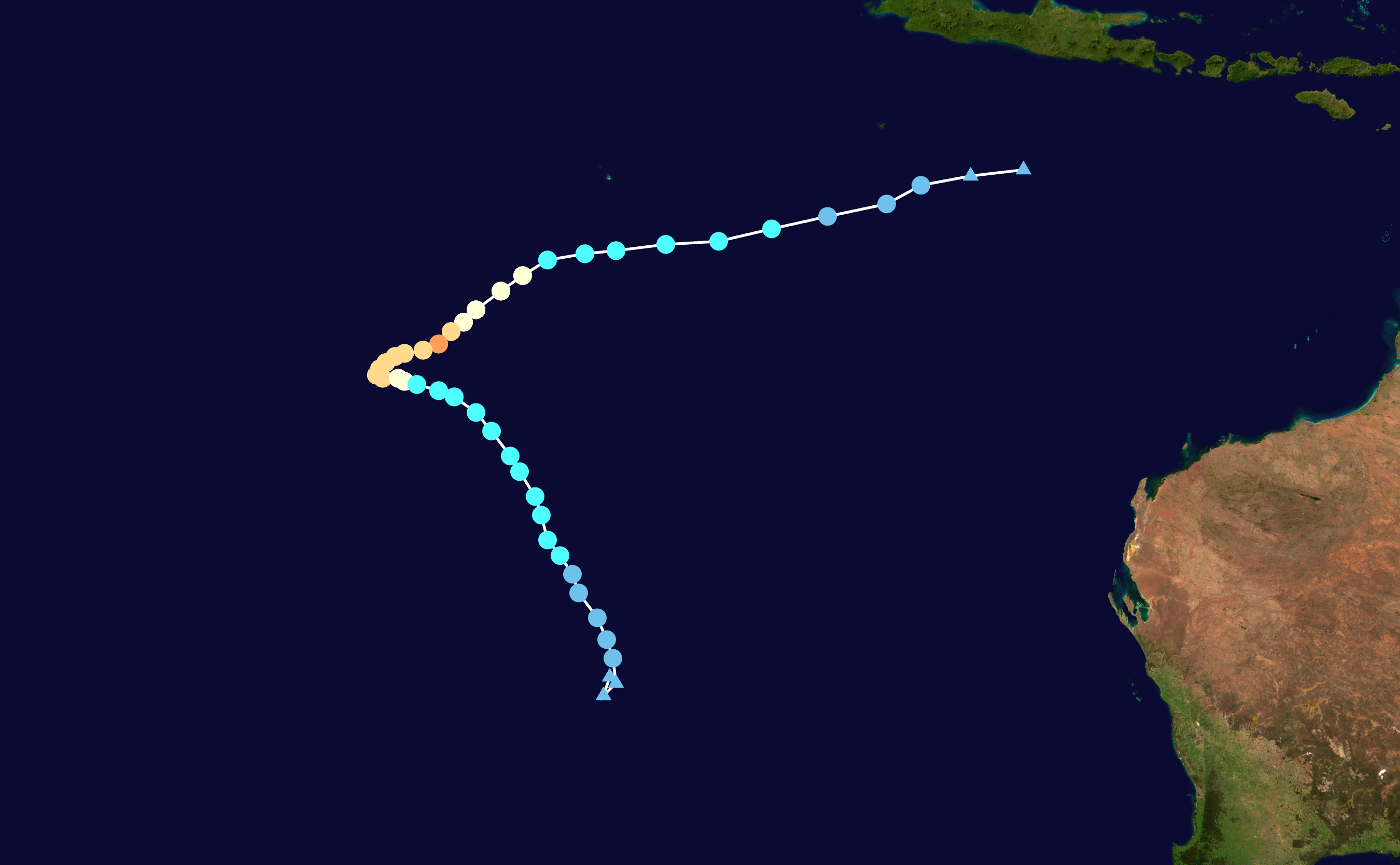
- Duration: 1 March (Entered basin) – 2 March (Exited basin)
- Peak intensity: 150 km/h (90 mph) (10-min); 962 hPa (mbar)

At 06:00 UTC on 1 March, Severe Tropical Cyclone Marian entered the area of responsibility of Météo-France La Réunion (MFR) after crossing the 90th meridian east from the Australian region. At the time, the system was assessed as a Category 3 severe tropical cyclone on the Australian scale, with maximum 10-minute sustained winds of 150 km/h (95 mph) and a central atmospheric pressure of 964 hPa (28.47 inHg). Upon entering the South-West Indian Ocean (SWIO) basin, the system was classified as a tropical cyclone by MFR. Due to the short period of time that Marian was expected to stay in the SWIO basin before returning to the Australian region, it was agreed that the MFR would defer responsibility for providing official information on the system to the Australian Bureau of Meteorology (BOM). Upon entering the basin, Marian become slow-moving in a competing steering environment, caught between ridges of high pressure to the north and south. After a plateau in intensity lasting for more than a day, marked by an eyewall replacement cycle and periodic waxing and waning of deep convection around the core, Marian began to strengthen again on 2 March. Maximum 10-minute sustained winds increased to 155 km/h, with gusts to 220 km/h and a minimum atmospheric pressure of 955 hPa (28.20 inHg). The increase in intensity proved short-lived, however, and the cyclone began to gradually weaken as it commenced a slow track back towards the east. Marian exited the SWIO basin just before 12:00 UTC on 2 March.

=== Very Intense Tropical Cyclone Habana ===
- Very intense tropical cyclone (MFR)
- Category 4 tropical cyclone (SSHWS)
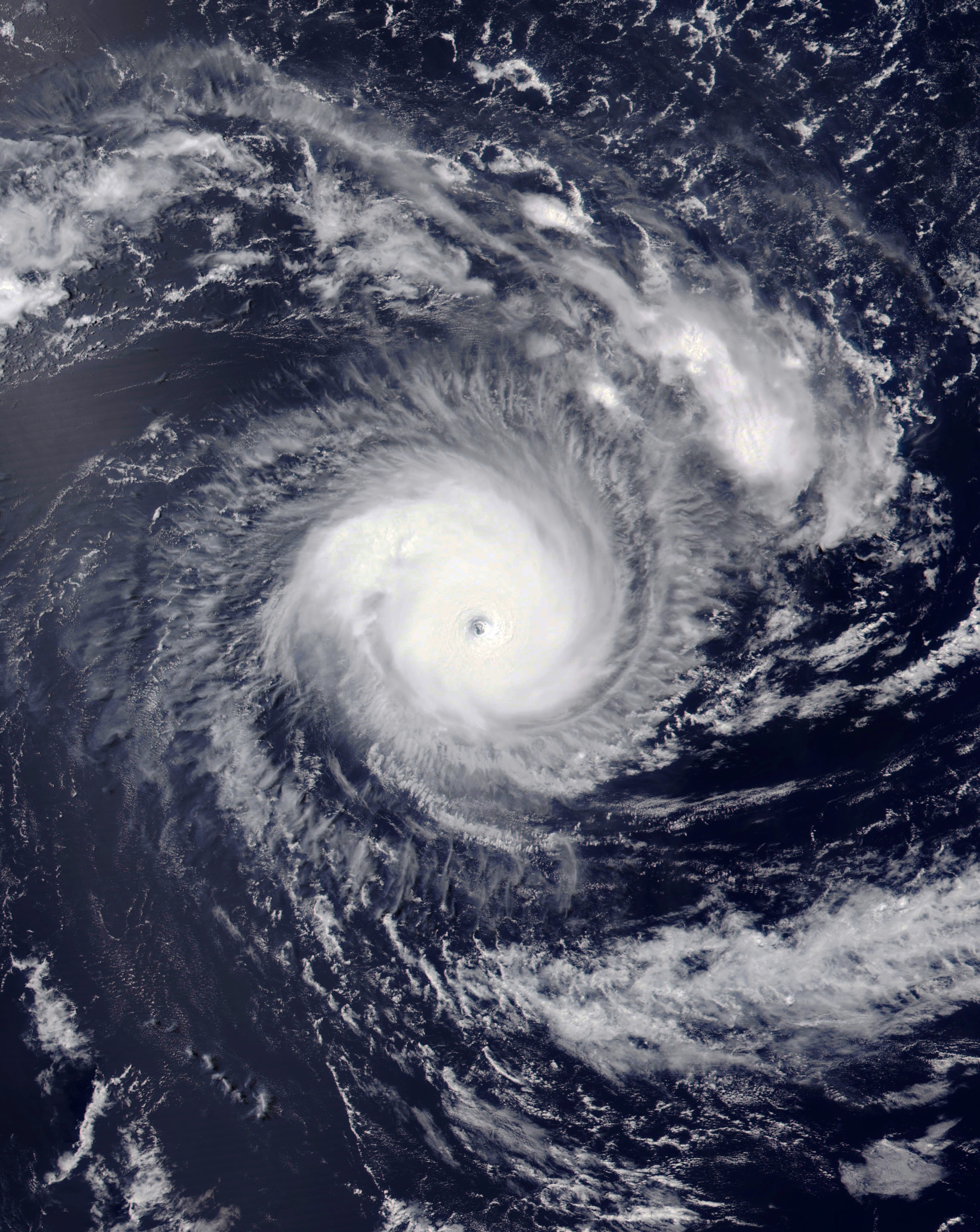
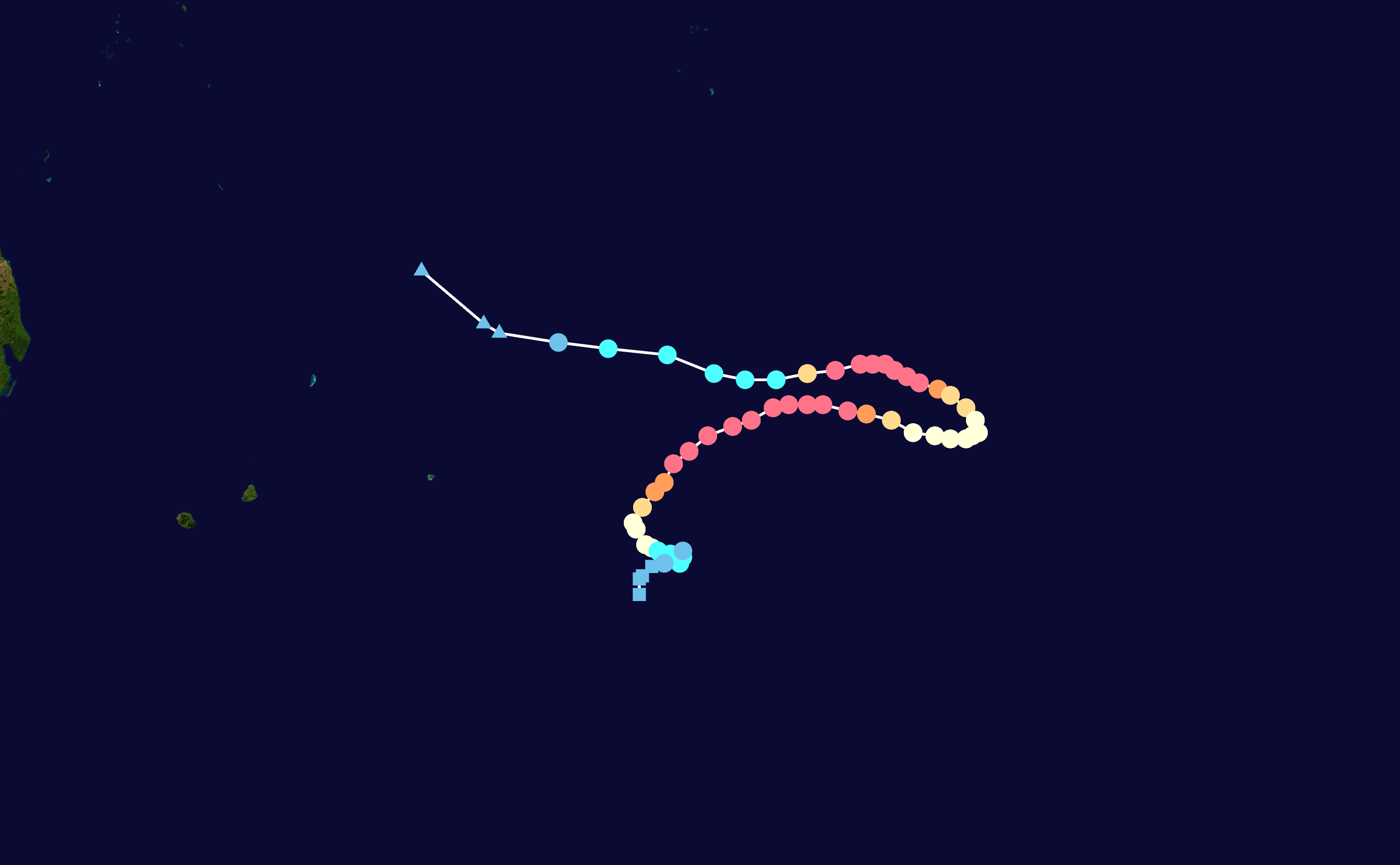
- Duration: 2 March – 16 March
- Peak intensity: 220 km/h (140 mph) (10-min); 935 hPa (mbar)

On 2 March, Météo-France La Réunion (MFR) began to monitor a disturbance associated with the convergence of the easterly monsoon flow and the trade winds. This was soon followed by the JTWC issuing a TCFA on the disturbance, which had previously been designated as Invest 90S, early the next day. Early by the next day, the system was designated as a zone of disturbed weather. As the system slowly developed a discernible core, it was designated Moderate Tropical Storm Habana at 12:00 UTC 4 March. Around the same time, the JTWC designated the system as a tropical storm. Under the influence of a near equatorial ridge, Habana was slowly steered east-southeastward and continued steady strengthening. Habana reached severe tropical storm strength on 5 March, with a shallow eye reforming. Forecasts at the time showed a weakening system, but Habana underwent explosive intensification in exponentially better conditions from a 95 km/h (60 mph) severe tropical storm to an intense tropical cyclone with 10-minute sustained winds of 185 km/h (115 mph) in 12 hours that same day. It reached its first peak strength with 10-minute sustained winds of 205 km/h (125 mph) and minimum pressure of 938 mb (27.69 inHg) on 6 March. The storm's strengthening trend slowed down, but it maintained a very well-defined pinhole eye and compact core structure, while the JTWC assessed Habana as having 1-minute sustained winds of 230 km/h (145 mph) at the time, equivalent to a mid-level Category 4 hurricane. On 7 March, the storm encountered some dry air and limited outflow and began to weaken, with the JTWC downgrading it to a Category 3-equivalent on the SSHWS as the eye collapsed entirely. Around the same time, MFR downgraded Habana back down to a tropical cyclone as the structure quickly deteriorated. The intrusion of dry air lead to Habana to continue rapidly weakening, with the storm's winds dropping to 120 km/h (75 mph) by 8 March.

After completing a turn to the south-southwest on 9 March, Habana slowly gained strength as it moved into more favorable conditions. By 10 March, Habana began to rapidly intensify yet again and thus the MFR upgraded Habana back to an intense tropical cyclone at 06:00 UTC that day. Around the same time, the JTWC upgraded the storm to a Category 4-equivalent tropical cyclone with winds of 250 km/h (155 mph) as the storm's eye cleared out on satellite imagery while the MFR assessed maximum winds at 205 km/h (125 mph) and a minimum pressure of 935 mbar at second peak intensity. However, Habana began to fall in strength as it began to undergo an eyewall replacement cycle. After finishing the eyewall replacement cycle on 11 March, Habana began yet another strengthening trend with the eye becoming much more wide and symmetrical. Habana reached its third peak intensity that day with maximum wind 220 km/h (135 mph) and minimum central pressure of 935 mb (27.73 inHg) by MFR. At the same time, JTWC also raised the wind speed back to 250 km/h (155 mph) once again, become the second Very Intense Tropical Cyclone of the season. Around the same time, on 12 March, the storm began to resemble an annular tropical cyclone with a very large but somewhat ragged eye and a highly symmetrical structure. Over the next 2 days, as wind shear quickly became unfavorable and relative humidity decreased significantly, the storm began to rapidly weaken whilst falling below tropical cyclone intensity on 14 March with a partially exposed low-level circulation center. On the same day, the system also made a small counterclockwise loop to the east. Habana soon weakened further, with a fully exposed center and decaying convection as dry air continued to plague the system. MFR issued their final warning on Habana on 16 March as the storm lost all of its convection.

=== Moderate Tropical Storm Iman ===
- Moderate tropical storm (MFR)
- Tropical storm (SSHWS)
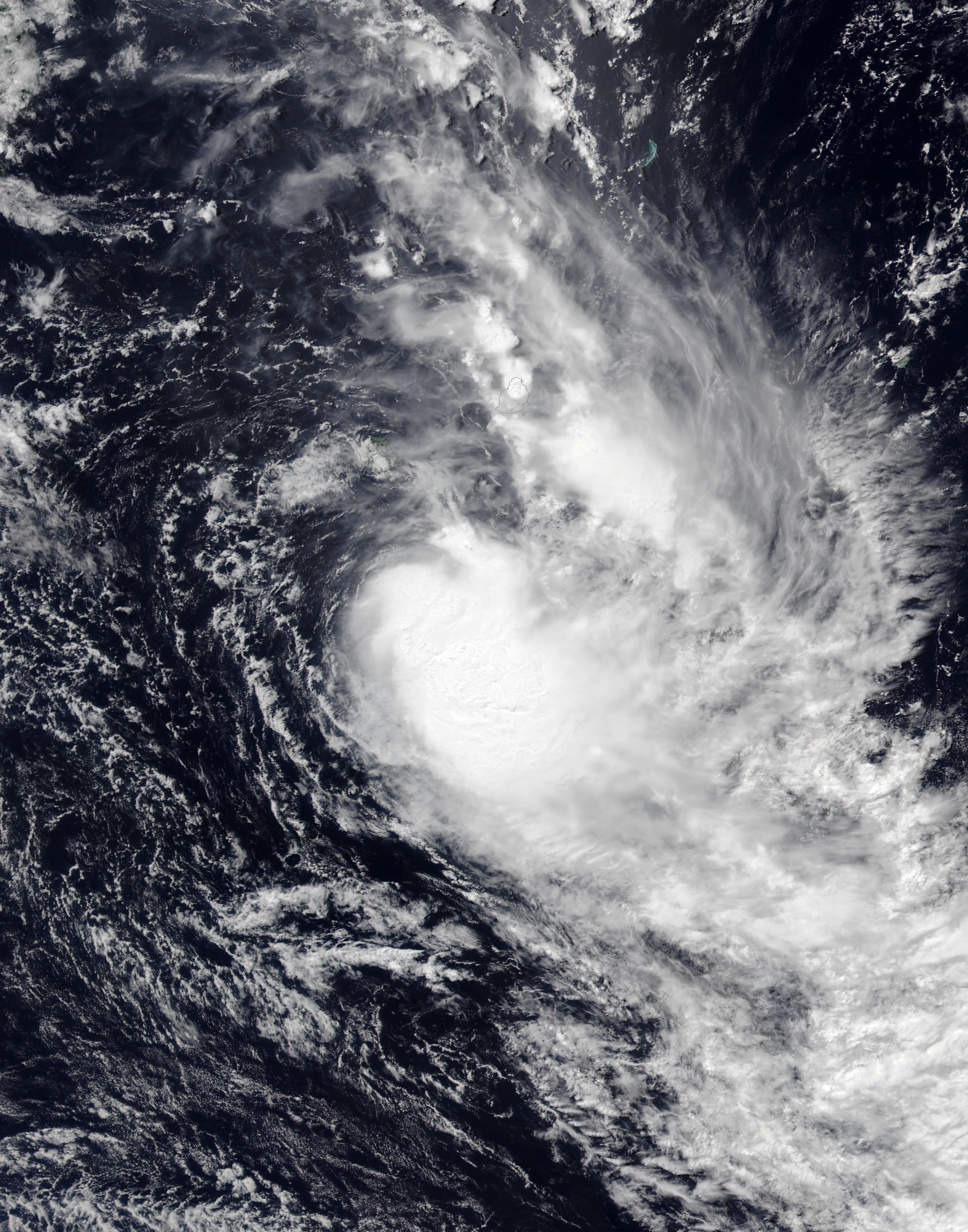
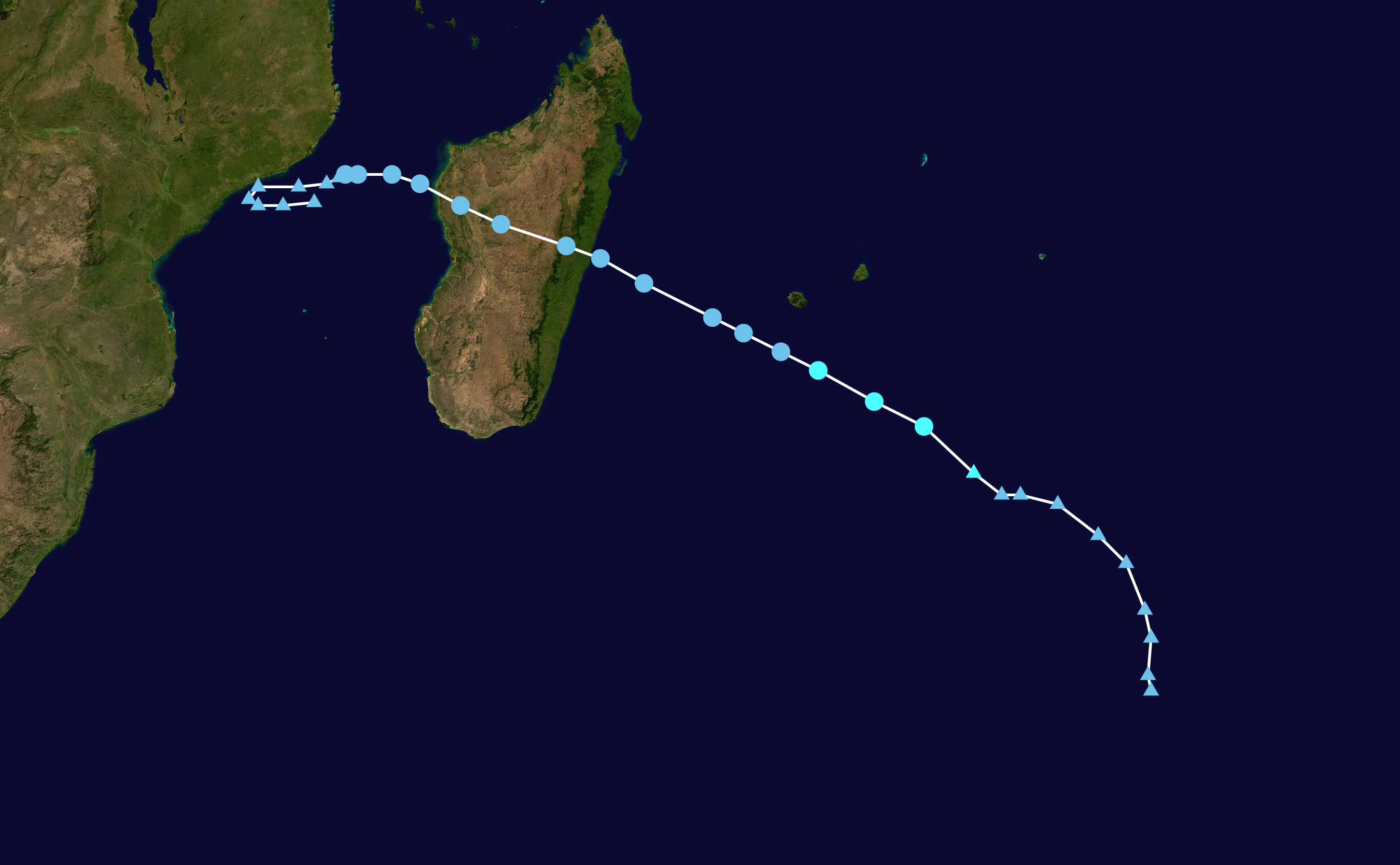
- Duration: 2 March – 8 March
- Peak intensity: 85 km/h (50 mph) (10-min); 992 hPa (mbar)

On 2 March, a weak tropical disturbance quickly formed within the monsoonal flow in the Mozambique Channel. The weak system slowly became more organized despite moderate wind shear, strengthening to a tropical depression by the next day. Before the system could strengthen in relatively favorable conditions, it made landfall in Madagascar around 09:50 UTC 5 March as a tropical depression and began to rapidly weaken. After accelerating through the Malagasy landmass, the system re-emerged over water near Vatomandry on 6 March, with the circulation of the storm having become elongated. As the storm passed to the southwest of the Mascarene Islands on 7 March, it strengthened into Moderate Tropical Storm Iman at 00:00 UTC that day, with the development of a rainband and a central dense overcast. Iman began to accelerate southeastward, steered by a mid-latitude trough, while maintaining its strength with little change in structure. On the next day, as the storm continued to accelerate, wind shear skyrocketed and the storm quickly deteriorated in structure. Thus, the JTWC issued its final warning on the system later that day. All convection eventually dissipated, and MFR also issued their final warning at 12:00 UTC 8 March.

On 6 March, Réunion was put under a yellow alert due to the depression. Officials anticipated a brief but intense period of severe weather related to the cyclone. The intense thunderstorms associated with the curved band of Iman passed directly over the island, bringing an unusually powerful lightning storm with over 3,000 estimated lightning strikes occurring. Widespread rainfall brought rainfall totals as high as 309 mm (1.01 ft) in Sainte-Rose. Some areas in Saint-Denis were flooded and some trees were uprooted. Over 15,000 people lost power on the island, although around 3,000 had gained electricity again 5 hours later.

=== Tropical Depression 15 ===
- Tropical depression (MFR)
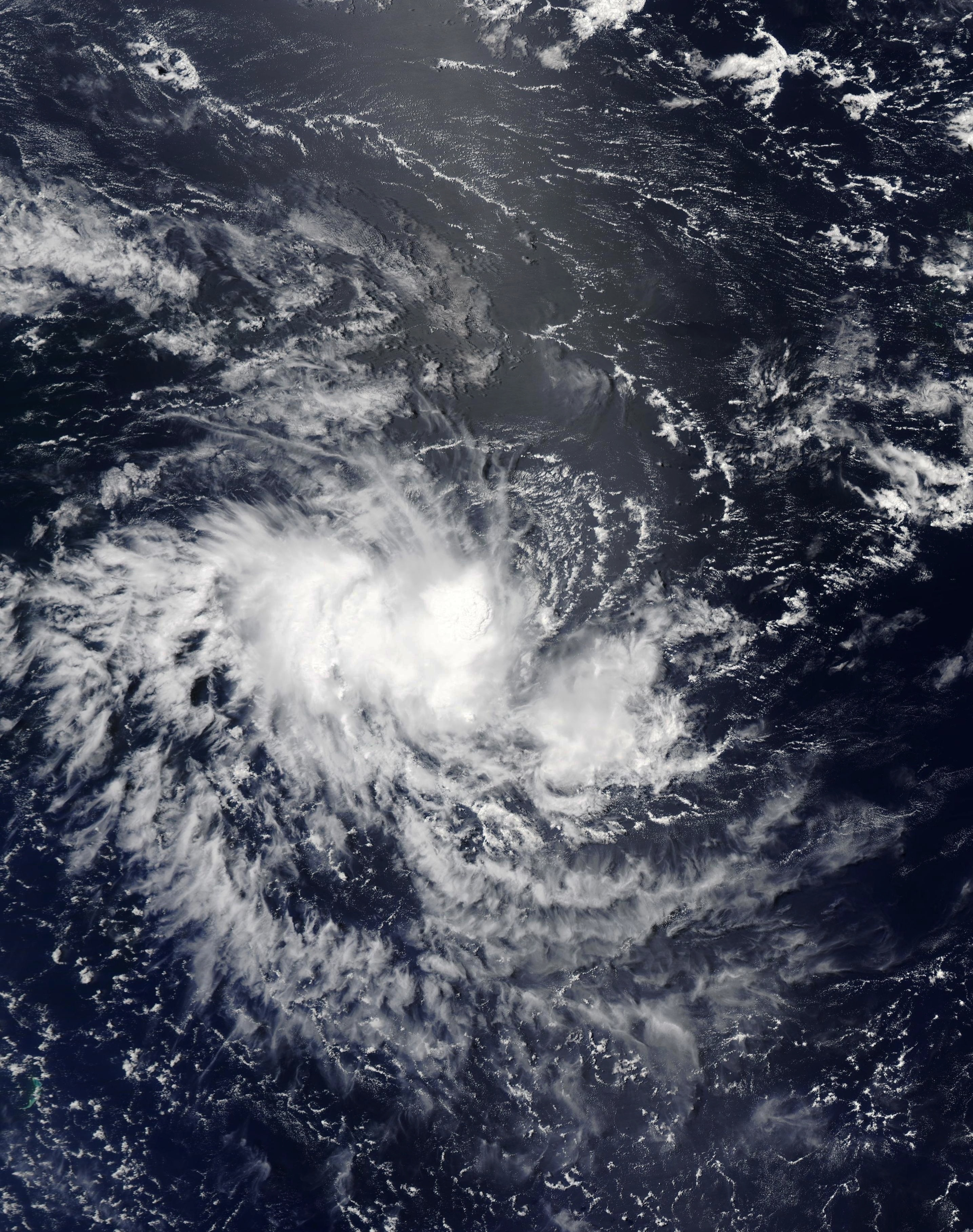
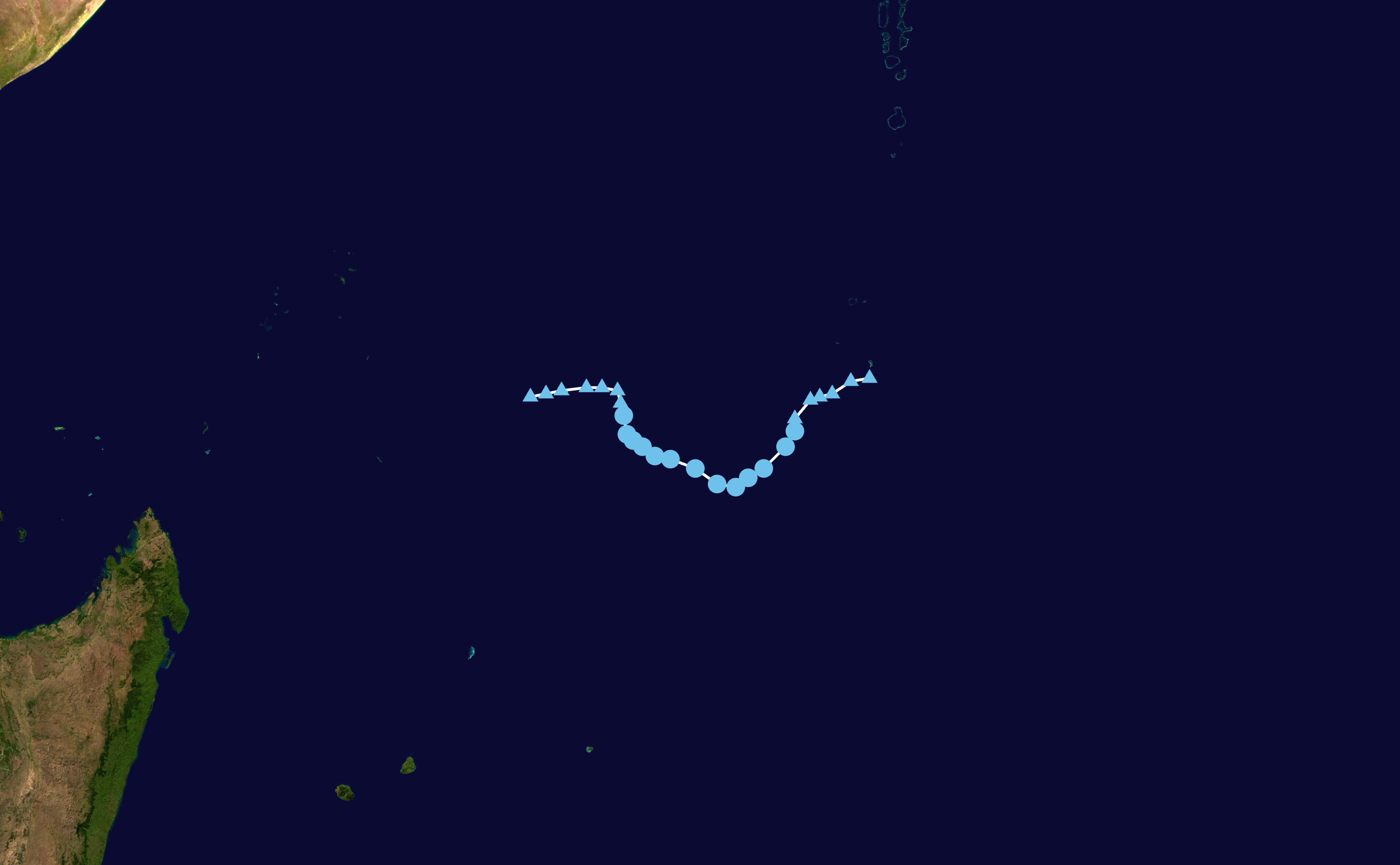
- Duration: 25 March – 28 March
- Peak intensity: 55 km/h (35 mph) (10-min); 998 hPa (mbar)

On 23 March, Météo-France La Réunion (MFR) first noted that the development of a closed low southwest of Diego Garcia was possible under the influence of north-westerly winds being enhanced by the equatorial side of a regenerating monsoon trough. The system was first noted as a zone of disturbed weather on 25 March as convection grew more organized. By 26 March, the system had developed a broad closed low level circulation with a curved band pattern but was namely struggling due to moderate wind shear. Despite this, the circulation intensified to warrant an upgrade to Tropical Depression 15 at 06:00 UTC 27 March while the JTWC issued a Tropical Cyclone Formation Alert around the same time. As shear strengthened, the system continued developing large but short lived bursts of convection attempting to cover the exposed circulation at the time. All thunderstorms associated with the low level circulation eventually collapsed by midday on 28 March and the last advisory was issued by MFR at that time. The JTWC also cancelled their Tropical Cyclone Formation Alert, early the next day.

=== Tropical Cyclone Jobo ===
- Tropical cyclone (MFR)
- Tropical storm (SSHWS)
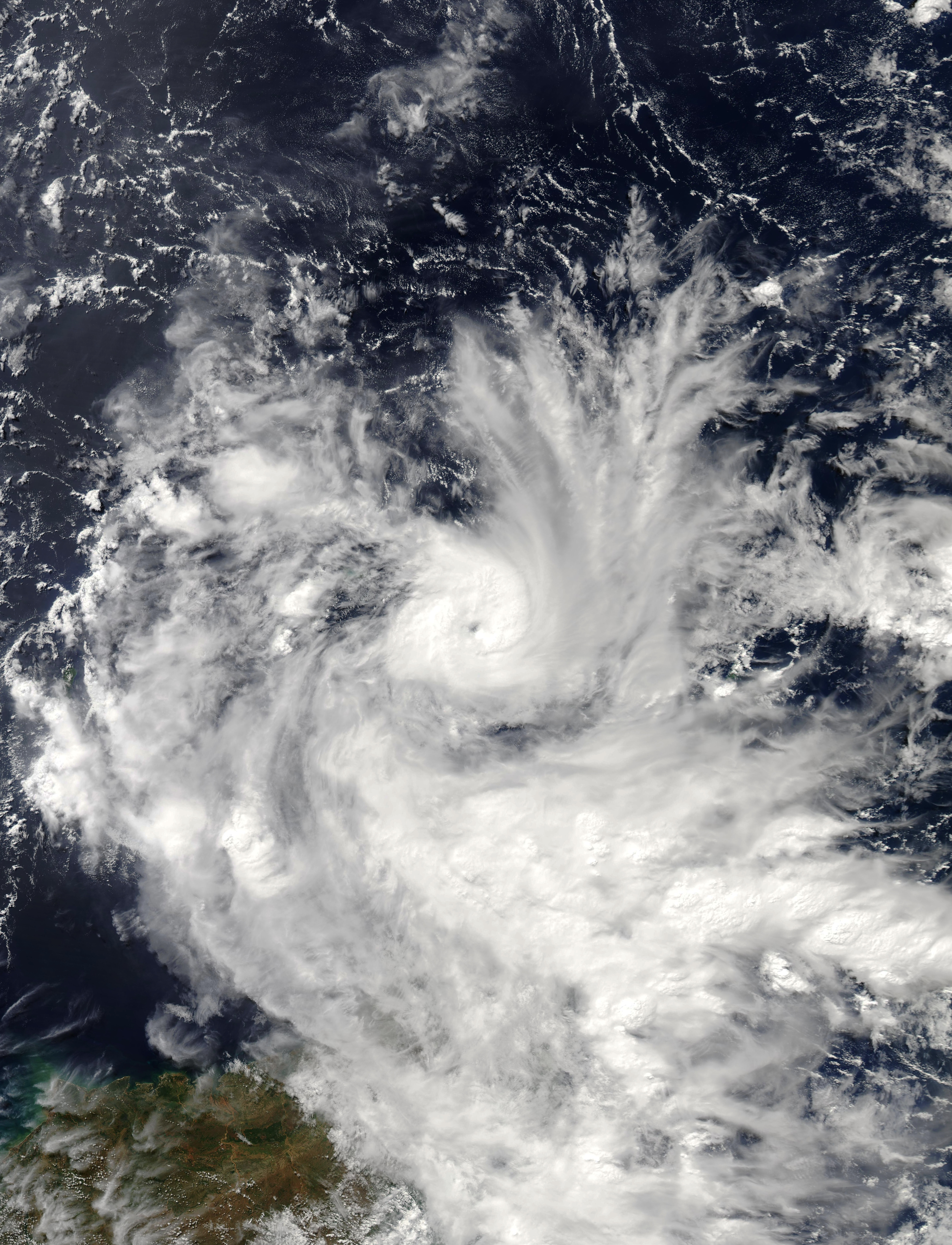
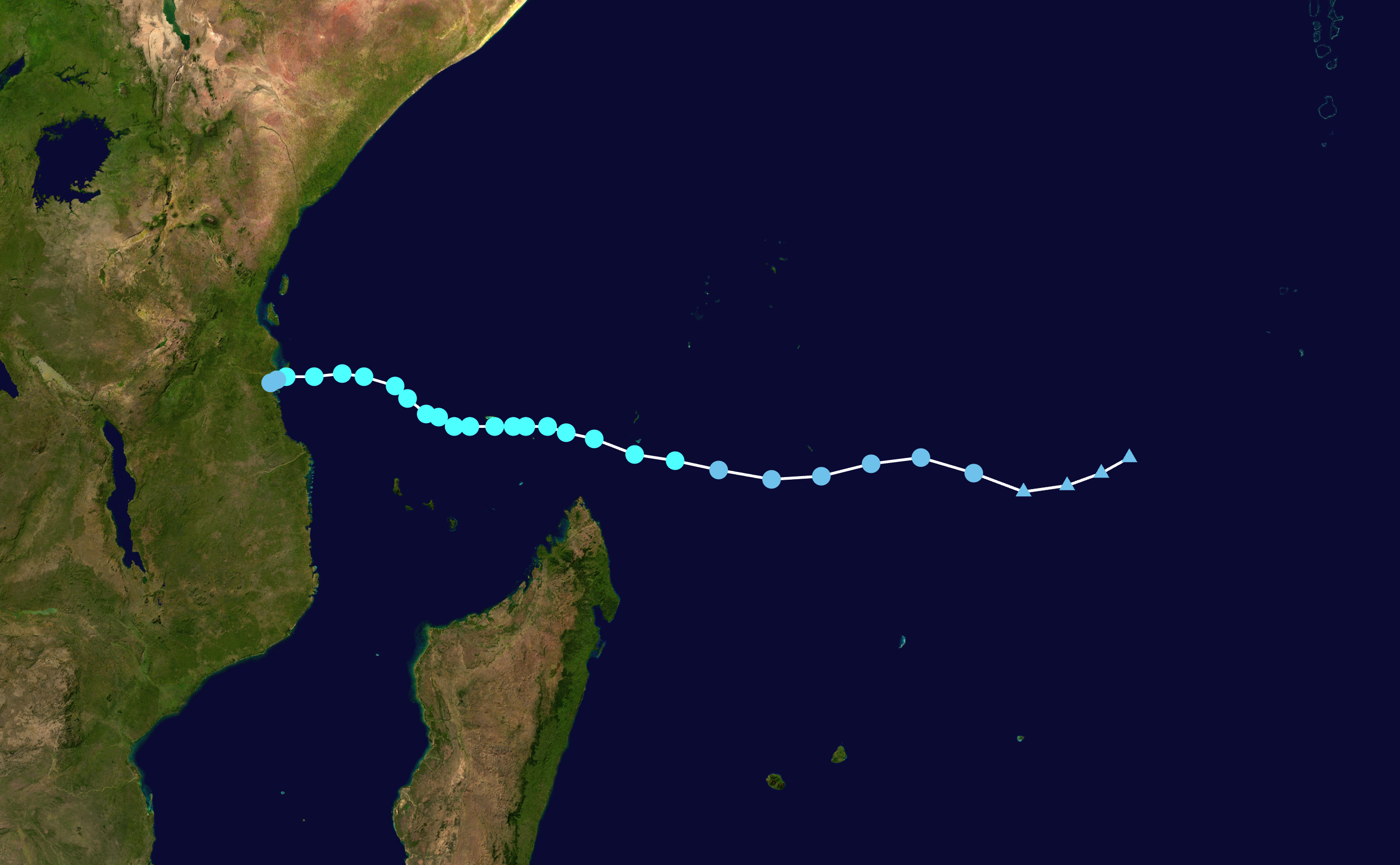
- Duration: 18 April – 24 April
- Peak intensity: 120 km/h (75 mph) (10-min); 980 hPa (mbar)

As far back as 10 April, Météo-France La Réunion (MFR) had begun to monitor a broad clockwise circulation which had formed east of the Chagos Archipelago. The poorly defined disturbance tracked westward for several days, and by 15 April, had established some minimal thunderstorm activity. However, despite highly unfavorable low-level convergence, via the enhancement of an equatorial Rossby wave it had allowed the system to sustain a cyclonic circulation. By 12:00 UTC on 19 April, the system had consolidated into a zone of disturbed weather, according to MFR. The disturbance rather quickly increased in organization as environmental conditions improved by early on 20 April, meeting the criteria to be designated a tropical depression. The very small system further strengthened, earning the name Jobo at 18:00 UTC that day as it reached moderate tropical storm strength about 215 km (133 mi) north-northeast of Andranovondronina, Madagascar.

Jobo began to rapidly intensify in more favorable conditions with a moist atmosphere and low wind shear. Due to these favorable conditions, Jobo strengthened to a severe tropical storm just 12 hours after it had been named at 06:00 UTC on 21 April as a tight curved rainband wrapped into the storm's highly compact core. Jobo reached tropical cyclone strength 6 hours later as a tiny eye had become visible on satellite imagery. However, due to its small size, the storm easily entrained dry air and encountered a small increase in wind shear, causing the storm's core to quickly deteriorate and cause it to weaken to severe tropical storm strength again. Jobo continued to be negatively effected by northwesterly wind shear, weakening to a moderate tropical storm on 22 April as its structure became increasingly disorganized. Between late on 22 April–23 April, Jobo began to re-strengthen with development of a small central dense overcast as wind shear leveled off slightly, but soon it became even more disorganized due to dry air. MFR determined Jobo degenerated into a remnant low about 40 km (24.8 mi) off the coast of Tanzania on 24 April, and the last advisory was issued.

Jobo as a severe tropical storm brought damage such as fallen trees and roofs being damaged on homes across Cosmoledo Atoll in Seychelles while wind gusts as high as 150 km/h (90 mph) were recorded in Astove Atoll to the south, all buildings having been "cyclone-proofed" since the passing of Cyclone Fantala in 2016. The islands of Farquhar, Assumption, and Aldabra also experienced some locally strong winds, high waves, and heavy rainfall, but no major damage. A small lightning storm also occurred on Assumption Island. As Jobo approached Tanzania, weather forecasts brought the storm track increasingly close to the highly populated city of Dar es Salaam. Rainfall totals were expected to be as high as 200 mm (7.87 in), or a month's worth of rain due to the cyclone. The autonomous region of Zanzibar suspended all marine travel on 24 April. The storm killed 22 people in the country.

== Storm names ==
Tropical depressions and subtropical depressions are assigned a name when they intensify to have 10-minute sustained winds of 65 km/h (40 mph) as assessed by the Regional Specialized Meteorological Center on La Réunion Island, France (RSMC La Réunion). The Sub-Regional Tropical Cyclone Advisory Center in Mauritius assigns a name to a cyclone if it intensifies into a moderate tropical storm between 55°E and 90°E. A cyclone is assigned a name by the Sub-Regional Tropical Cyclone Advisory Center in Madagascar if it intensifies into a moderate tropical storm between 30°E and 55°E. Storm names are taken from three pre-determined lists of names, which rotate on a triennial basis, with any names that have been used automatically removed. Therefore, all storm names used this year will be removed from the rotation and replaced with a new name for the 2023–24 season, while the unused names will remain on the list. New names this season were: Alicia, Bongoyo, Chalane, Danilo, Eloise, and Faraji. They replaced names used during the 2017–18 season – Ava, Berguitta, Cebile, Dumazile, Eliakim, and Fakir.

- Alicia
- Bongoyo
- Chalane
- Danilo
- Eloise
- Faraji
- Guambe
- Habana
- Iman
- Jobo
- Kanga (unused)
- Ludzi (unused)
- Melina (unused)
- Nathan (unused)
- Onias (unused)
- Pelagie (unused)
- Quamar (unused)
- Rita (unused)
- Solani (unused)
- Tarik (unused)
- Urilia (unused)
- Vuyane (unused)
- Wagner (unused)
- Xusa (unused)
- Yarona (unused)
- Zacarias (unused)

If a tropical cyclone enters the South-West Indian basin from the Australian region basin (west of 90°E), it will retain the name assigned to it by the Australian Bureau of Meteorology (BOM). The following storms were named in this manner:

- Joshua
- Marian

After the season, the ten names used were automatically retired and replaced with Alvaro, Belal, Candice, Djoungou, Eleanor, Filipo, Gamane, Hidaya, Ialy and Jeremy, respectively for the 2023–24 season.

== Season effects ==
This table lists all of the tropical cyclones and subtropical cyclones that were monitored during the 2020–2021 South-West Indian Ocean cyclone season. Information on their intensity, duration, name, areas affected, primarily comes from RSMC La Réunion. Death and damage reports come from either press reports or the relevant national disaster management agency while the damage totals are given in 2020 or 2021 USD.

Name	Dates	Peak intensity			Areas affected	Damage (USD)	Deaths	Ref(s).
Name	Dates	Category	Wind speed	Pressure	Areas affected	Damage (USD)	Deaths	Ref(s).
Alicia	12 – 17 November	Tropical cyclone	120 km/h (75 mph)	975 hPa (28.79 inHg)	None	None	None	
02	14 – 17 November	Tropical depression	55 km/h (35 mph)	999 hPa (29.50 inHg)	None	None	None	
Bongoyo	4 – 10 December	Severe tropical storm	110 km/h (70 mph)	980 hPa (28.94 inHg)	Cocos Islands	None	None	
Chalane	19 – 30 December	Severe tropical storm	110 km/h (70 mph)	975 hPa (28.79 inHg)	Madagascar, Mozambique, Southern Africa	>$134,000	7	
Five	28 December – 3 January	Tropical depression	55 km/h (35 mph)	998 hPa (29.47 inHg)	Cocos Islands	None	None	
Danilo	28 December – 12 January	Severe tropical storm	100 km/h (65 mph)	982 hPa (29.00 inHg)	Chagos Archipelago	None	None	
Eloise	14 – 25 January	Tropical cyclone	150 km/h (90 mph)	965 hPa (28.50 inHg)	Madagascar, Mozambique, Southern Africa	$90 million	27	
Joshua	17 – 19 January	Severe tropical storm	95 km/h (60 mph)	988 hPa (29.18 inHg)	None	None	None	
09	27 – 28 January	Tropical depression	55 km/h (35 mph)	1001 hPa (29.56 inHg)	None	None	None	
Faraji	4 – 13 February	Very intense tropical cyclone	220 km/h (140 mph)	935 hPa (27.61 inHg)	None	None	None	
Guambe	10 – 22 February	Tropical cyclone	150 km/h (90 mph)	957 hPa (28.26 inHg)	Madagascar, Southern Africa	Unknown	None	
Marian	1 – 2 March	Tropical cyclone	150 km/h (90 mph)	962 hPa (28.41 inHg)	None	None	None	
Habana	2 – 16 March	Very Intense tropical cyclone	220 km/h (140 mph)	935 hPa (27.61 inHg)	None	None	None	
Iman	2 – 8 March	Moderate tropical storm	85 km/h (50 mph)	992 hPa (29.29 inHg)	Mozambique, Madagascar, Réunion, Mauritius	Unknown	None	
15	25 – 28 March	Tropical depression	55 km/h (35 mph)	998 hPa (29.47 inHg)	None	None	None	
Jobo	18 – 24 April	Tropical cyclone	120 km/h (75 mph)	980 hPa (28.94 inHg)	Seychelles, Northern Madagascar, Tanzania	Unknown	22	
Season aggregates
16 systems	12 November – 24 April		220 km/h (140 mph)	935 hPa (27.61 inHg)		>$90.1 million	56	

== See also ==
- Weather of 2020 and 2021
- List of Southern Hemisphere tropical cyclone seasons
- Tropical cyclones in 2020 and 2021
- Atlantic hurricane seasons: 2020, 2021
- Pacific hurricane seasons: 2020, 2021
- Pacific typhoon seasons: 2020, 2021
- North Indian Ocean cyclone seasons: 2020, 2021
- 2020–21 Australian region cyclone season
- 2020–21 South Pacific cyclone season
