= Tropical cyclones in 2021 =

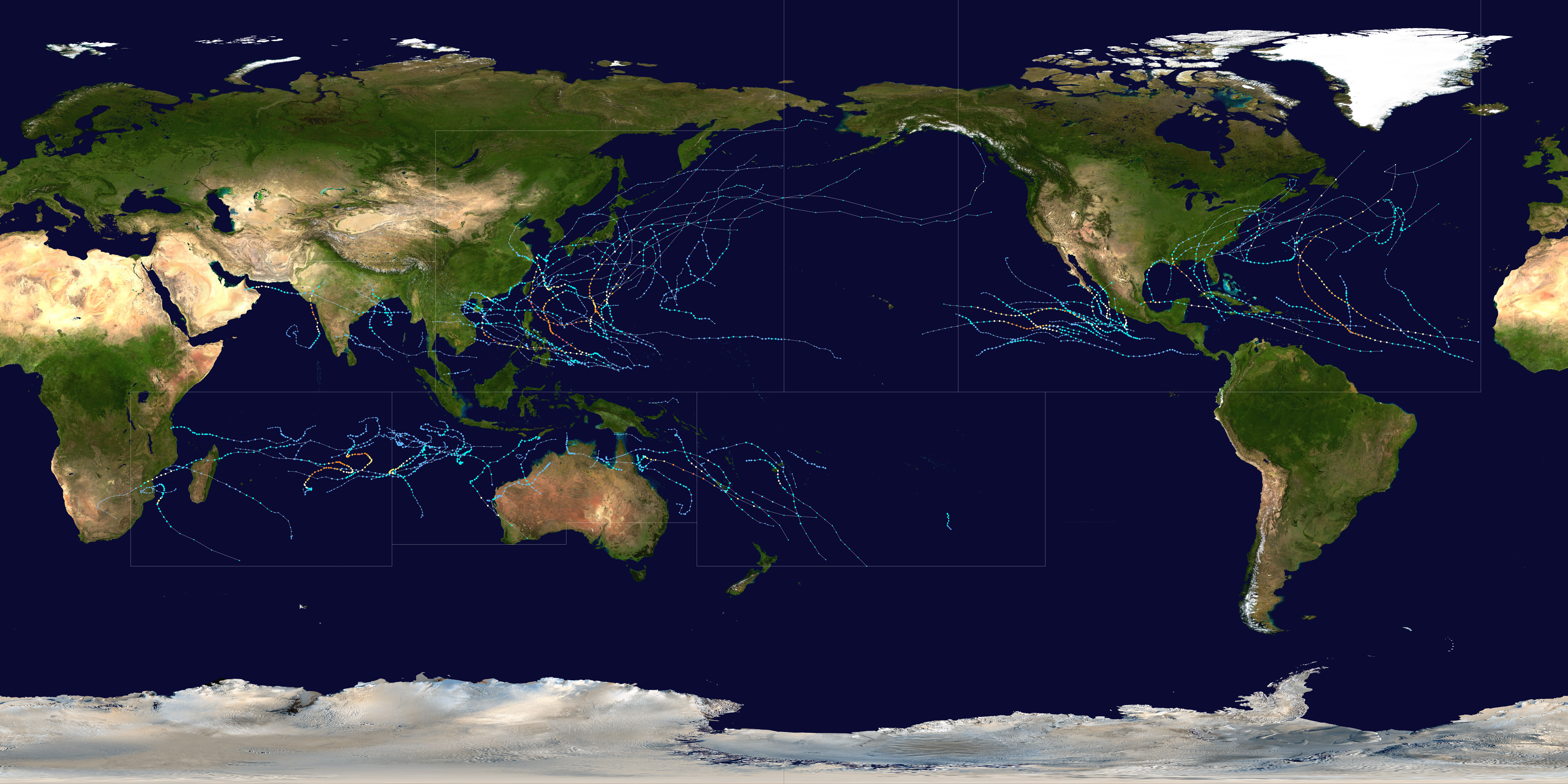
- Year summary map

Year boundaries
- First system: Imogen
- Formed: January 1, 2021
- Last system: Seth
- Dissipated: January 6, 2022

Strongest system
- Name: Surigae
- Lowest pressure: 895 mbar (hPa); 26.43 inHg

Longest lasting system
- Name: Habana, Omais and Sam
- Duration: 14 days

Year statistics
- Total systems: 137
- Named systems: 95
- Total fatalities: 1,371 total
- Total damage: $92.645 billion (2021 USD)
Related articles
- 2021 Atlantic hurricane season
- 2021 Pacific hurricane season
- 2021 Pacific typhoon season
- 2021 North Indian Ocean cyclone season
- 2020–21 South-West Indian Ocean cyclone season
- 2021–22 South-West Indian Ocean cyclone season
- 2020–21 Australian region cyclone season
- 2021–22 Australian region cyclone season
- 2020–21 South Pacific cyclone season
- 2021–22 South Pacific cyclone season

During 2021, tropical cyclones formed in seven major bodies of water, commonly known as tropical cyclone basins. Tropical cyclones will be assigned names by various weather agencies if they attain maximum sustained winds of 35 knots (65 km/h; 40 mph). During the year, 137 systems have formed and 95 were named, including one subtropical depression and excluding one system, which was unofficial. One storm was given two names by the same RSMC. The most intense storm of the year was Typhoon Surigae, with maximum 10-minute sustained wind speeds of 220 km/h (140 mph) and a minimum pressure of 895 hPa (26.43 inHg). The deadliest tropical cyclone was Typhoon Rai, which caused 410 fatalities in the Philippines and 1 in Vietnam, while the costliest was Hurricane Ida, which caused an estimated $75.25 billion USD in damage after striking Louisiana and the Northeastern United States.

Like last year, 2021 had an above average amount of tropical cyclones globally. The most active basin of the year was the West Pacific, which had another below average season, with only 23 named storms. The North Atlantic had another very active season, producing 21 named storms, while the East Pacific featured average activity, with 19 named storms forming in the basin. The North Indian basin was also average, featuring 5 named storms. The Southern Hemisphere featured relatively average activity, with Cyclones Faraji and Niran both attaining Category 5 intensity. The rest of the Category 5 tropical cyclones occurred in the West Pacific, totalling to six Category 5 tropical cyclones that formed during the year, tying 2003. However, the number of major tropical cyclones across the world was below average, with only 16 forming. The accumulated cyclone energy (ACE) index for 2021 (seven basins combined), as calculated by Colorado State University (CSU) was 621.1 units overall, which was below the 1991-2020 mean of 789.0 units globally.

Tropical cyclones are primarily monitored by a group of ten warning centers, which have been designated as a Regional Specialized Meteorological Centre (RSMC) or a Tropical Cyclone Warning Center (TCWC) by the World Meteorological Organization. These are the United States National Hurricane Center (NHC) and Central Pacific Hurricane Center, the Japan Meteorological Agency (JMA), the Indian Meteorological Department (IMD), Météo-France (MFR), Indonesia's Badan Meteorologi, Klimatologi, dan Geofisika, the Australian Bureau of Meteorology (BOM), Papua New Guinea's National Weather Service, the Fiji Meteorological Service (FMS) as well as New Zealand's MetService. Other notable warning centers include the Philippine Atmospheric, Geophysical, and Astronomical Services Administration (PAGASA), the United States Joint Typhoon Warning Center (JTWC), and the Brazilian Navy Hydrographic Center (BNHC).

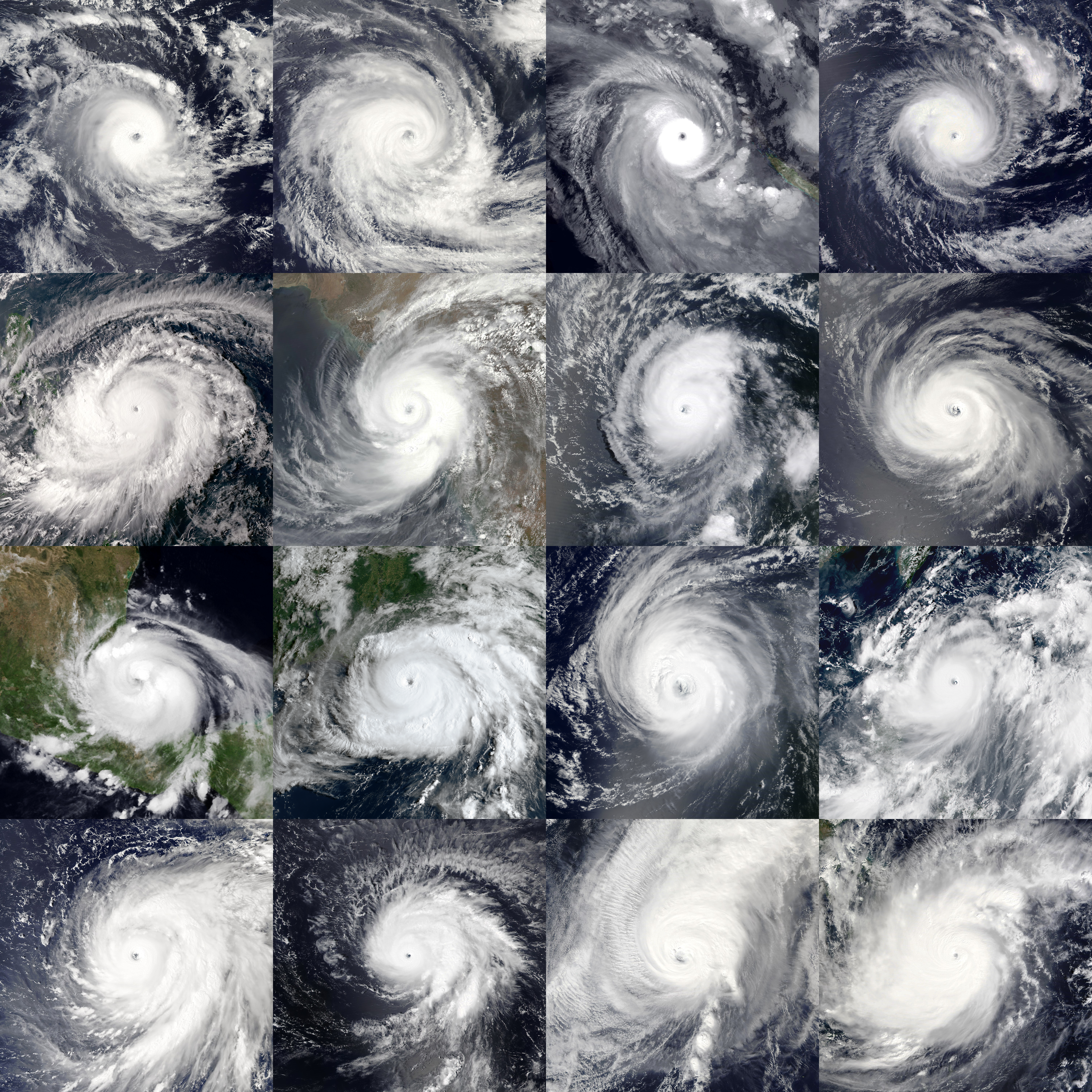
Taken by various of satellites throughout 2021, these are the 16 tropical cyclones that reached at least Category 3 on the Saffir-Simpson scale during that year, from Faraji in February to Rai in December. Among them, Surigae (first image in the second row) was the most intense with a minimum central pressure of 895 hPa.

== Global atmospheric and hydrological conditions ==
The La Niña from the previous year persisted into 2021, though by March and April it had begun to weaken. On May 13, the National Oceanic and Atmospheric Administration (NOAA) assessed that the El Niño–Southern Oscillation (ENSO) transitioned into its neutral phase. However, following cooler than normal temperatures in the tropical eastern Pacific Ocean, NOAA declared that the global weather conditions shifted back to La Niña by October.

Two systems, Tropical Depression 05 and Severe Tropical Storm Danilo persisted into 2021 after developing within the South-West Indian Ocean during December 2020. The COVID-19 pandemic disrupted responses and recovery in areas affected by tropical cyclones.

== Summary ==
=== North Atlantic Ocean ===
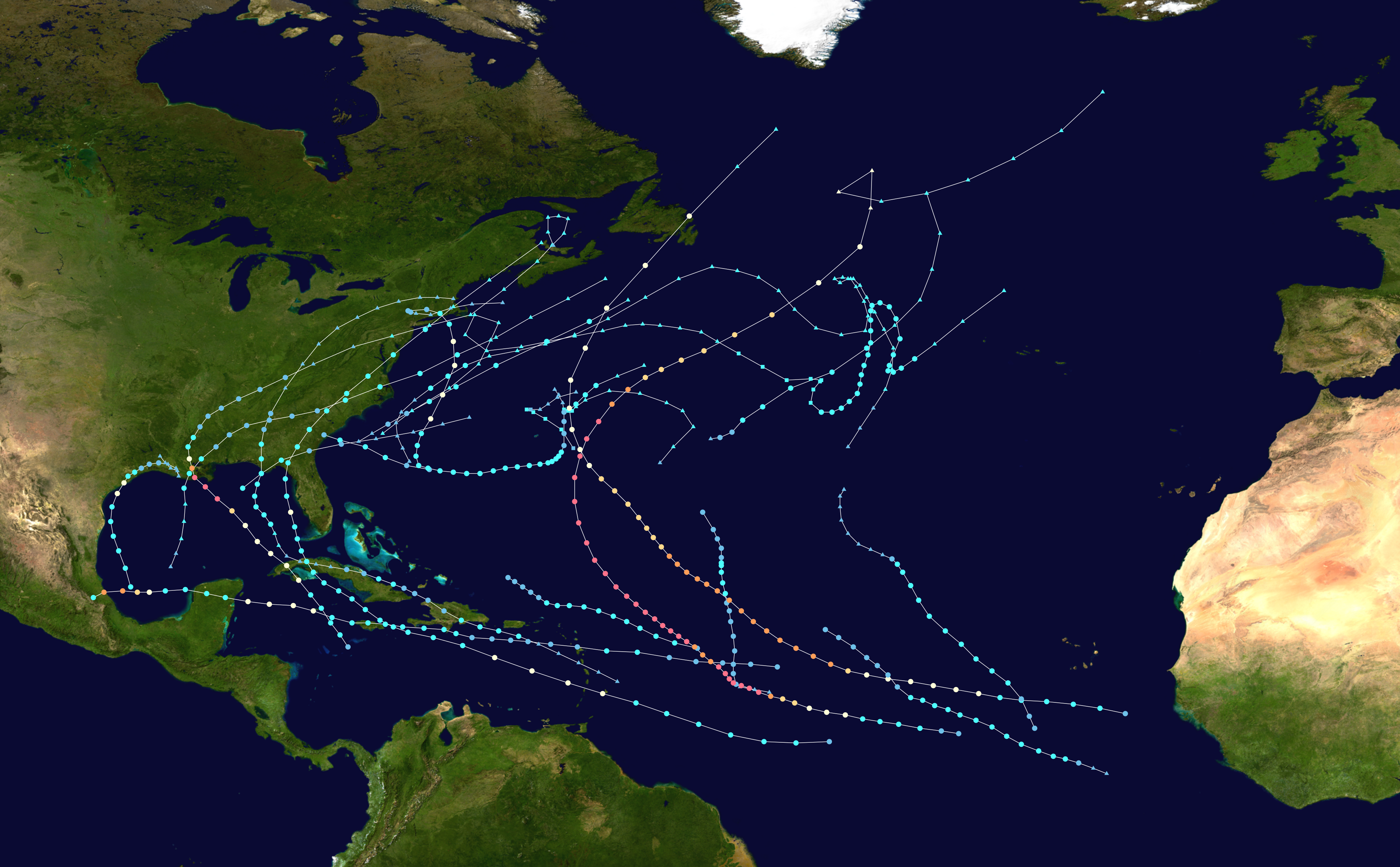
2021 Atlantic hurricane season summary map

The 2021 Atlantic hurricane season officially ran from June 1 to November 30. A total of 21 tropical depressions formed, all of which reached at least tropical or subtropical intensity. The season ranks as the third-most active of all time in the Atlantic basin, behind only 2005 and 2020. Consequently, the 2021 Atlantic hurricane season was the third on record to exhaust its naming list. Nine of the systems lasted for two days or less, tied with 2007 for the most since the NHC began monitoring subtropical systems in 1968. Although the season was highly active in terms of the number of named storms, seven of those tropical or subtropical systems intensified into a hurricane and four of those became a major hurricane, which is near-average and just slightly above-average, respectively. Nonetheless, 2021 marked the record sixth consecutive above-average season in the Atlantic. The ongoing warm Atlantic multidecadal oscillation, which began in 1995, contributed to the season's high level of activity, as it led to above-average sea surface temperatures in the Atlantic basin. Other factors included the presence of a La Niña and abnormally heavy West African Monsoon precipitation.

Collectively, the tropical and subtropical systems of the 2021 Atlantic hurricane season caused 194 deaths and about $80.727 billion in damage, making it the third costliest season on record. Eight named storms struck the United States, which is the third most ever, behind only the previous season and 1916. In conjunction with 2020, 19 systems of at least tropical storm intensity made landfall in the country during the two seasons, surpassing the record of 15 during the 2004 and 2005 seasons combined. As a result, some regions significantly impacted during the 2020 season were once again hit hard in 2021, especially eastern Louisiana and portions of the Northeastern United States. Rhode Island was struck by two tropical systems, Elsa and Henri, an unusual occurrence especially given that the state had recorded no landfalls since Bob in 1991. Four tropical cyclones or their remnants – Elsa, Fred, Ida, and Nicholas – each caused at least $1 billion in damage in the United States. The ACE index for the 2021 Atlantic hurricane season, as calculated by Colorado State University using data from the NHC, was approximately 146 units. The totals represent the sum of the squares for every (sub)tropical storm's intensity of over 39 mph (63 km/h), divided by 10,000. Therefore, the ACE index value does not include tropical depressions. Each season dating back to 2016 recorded ACE index values exceeding 129, which senior research associate Brian McNoldy of the University of Miami described as "unprecedented even for four years, let alone six!" Throughout the season, NOAA Hurricane Hunters logged 462.2 flight hours, conducting 58 eyewall passages and deploying 1,310 dropsondes in the process. NOAA also deployed 66 underwater gliders, which made 78,328 observations on oceanic salinity and temperatures. Additionally, NOAA used five unmanned saildrones to increase documentation on atmospheric and oceanic conditions across the Atlantic basin. One of the five saildrones became the first research vessel to ever enter a major hurricane when it reached Hurricane Sam on September 30. It recorded sustained winds of 125 mph (201 km/h) and waves up to 50 ft (15 m) in height while also capturing video footage from inside the storm.

Tropical Storm Ana formed on May 22, making 2021 the seventh consecutive year in which a tropical or subtropical cyclone formed before the season's official start. Ana formed in a location where no tropical storms within the month of May had been documented since before 1950. In mid-June, a rapidly developing non-tropical low offshore of the North Carolina coast became Tropical Storm Bill. The system lasted for only two days before becoming extratropical. Later that month, Tropical Storm Claudette formed just off the coast of Louisiana and Tropical Storm Danny developed offshore South Carolina. Overall, June featured three named storms, tied with 1886, 1909, 1936, and 1968 for the most during that month. Elsa formed on June 30 and became a tropical storm on the following day, making it the earliest fifth-named storm on record, surpassing the previous record by five days, set by Tropical Storm Edouard in 2020. It soon became the first hurricane of the season before impacting the Caribbean and making landfall in Cuba. Later, Elsa brought impacts to the Eastern United States, striking Florida on July 7 and New York and Rhode Island on July 9. Thereafter, activity came to a monthlong halt due to unfavorable conditions across the basin.

On August 11, Fred formed in the eastern Caribbean, bringing impacts to the Greater and Lesser Antilles, and the Southeastern United States. A few days later, Grace formed and strengthened into the second hurricane and first major hurricane of the season, and brought impacts to the Greater Antilles and the Yucatán Peninsula, before making landfall in the Mexican state of Veracruz. A third tropical system, Henri, developed on August 16, near Bermuda. Henri meandered for several days before becoming the third hurricane of the season on August 21 and impacted New England, causing record flooding in some places. Towards the end of the month, Hurricane Ida formed, leaving major damage in western Cuba before rapidly intensifying into a Category 4 hurricane and making landfall in southeastern Louisiana at peak intensity, producing widespread, catastrophic damage. Its remnants then generated a deadly tornado outbreak and widespread, record-breaking flooding across the Northeastern United States. Two other tropical storms, Julian and Kate, also existed briefly during this time but remained at sea. Larry formed on the last day of August and strengthened into a major hurricane early in September. It became the first hurricane to make landfall on Newfoundland since Igor in 2010. As the mid-point of the hurricane season approached, (Note: September 10 is the climatological mid-point of the Atlantic hurricane season.) Mindy formed on September 8 and struck the Florida Panhandle shortly thereafter. It was followed by Nicholas, which developed on September 12 and made landfall along the central Texas coast two days later as a hurricane. Three tropical storms—Odette, Peter, and Rose—then formed in quick succession and were steered by prevailing winds away from any interaction with land. The busy pace of storm-formation continued late into September. Sam, a long-lived major hurricane, developed in the central tropical Atlantic and proceeded to rapidly intensify from a tropical depression to a hurricane within 24 hours on September 23 and 24. Sam peaked in strength on September 26 as a high-end Category 4 hurricane. It remained a major hurricane (Category 3 or stronger) for nearly eight consecutive days, the longest continuous stretch at that intensity for an Atlantic hurricane since Ivan, in 2004. Meanwhile, Subtropical Storm Teresa formed north of Bermuda on September 24. Short-lived Victor developed late in the month at an unusually low latitude of 8.1°N, tying Kirk in 2018 and behind only an unnamed 1902 hurricane (7.7°N) for the southernmost location in which an Atlantic system has reached tropical storm intensity.

However, tropical cyclogenesis then paused again for much of the month of October, primarily due to the presence of drier air. For the first time since 2006 and only the second time during the hyperactive era which began in 1995, no named storms developed between October 6 and October 30. Finally, Subtropical Storm Wanda formed in the central North Atlantic on October 30 and transitioned into a fully tropical storm on November 1. This system was the same storm that previously had brought rain and damaging wind gusts to southern New England as a potent nor'easter. Wanda remained a tropical cyclone until transitioning into an extratropical low on November 7, which marked the conclusion of activity during the 2021 Atlantic hurricane season.

=== Eastern & Central Pacific Oceans ===
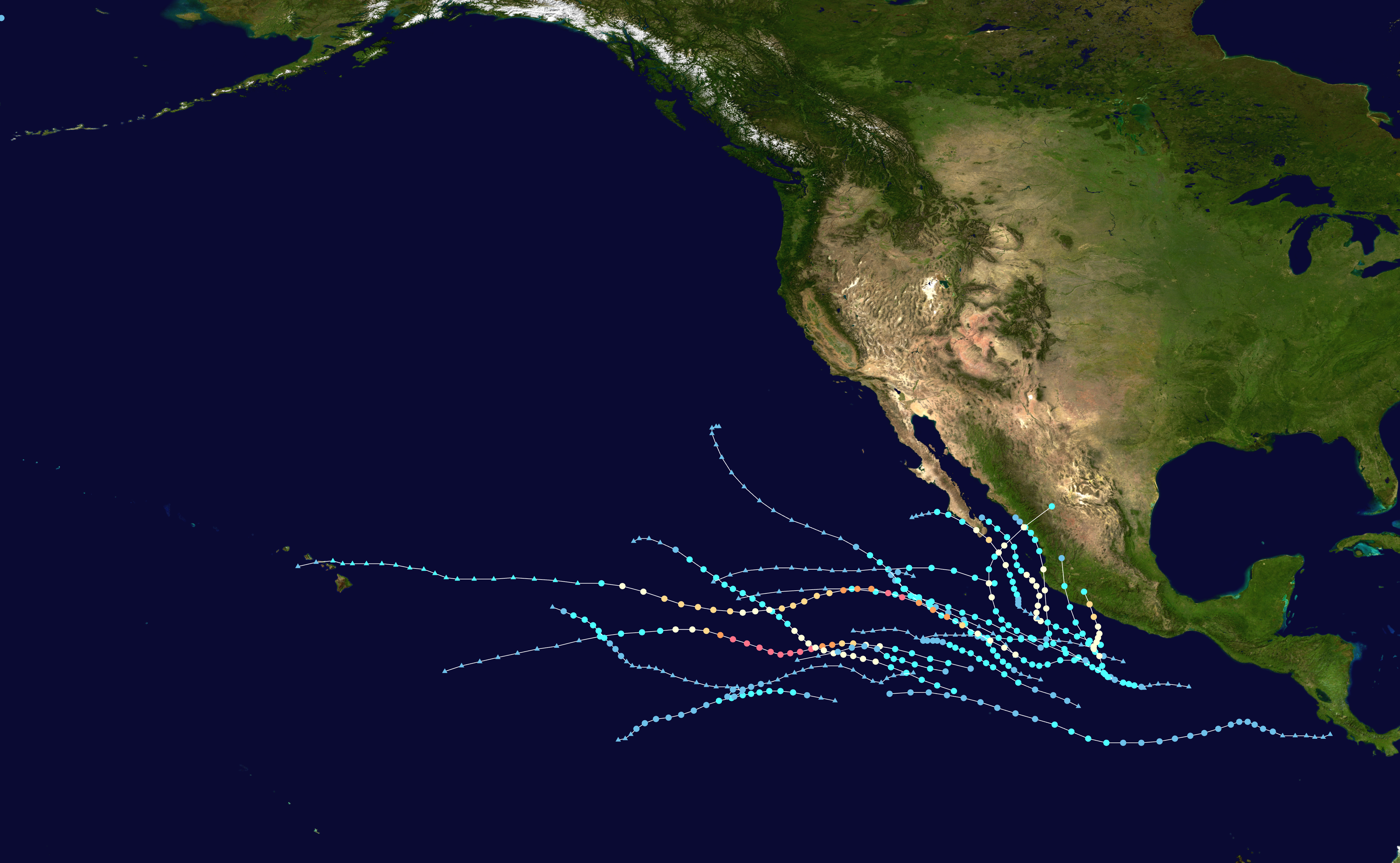
2021 Pacific hurricane season summary map

The 2021 Pacific hurricane season began on May 15 in the East Pacific and on June 1 in the Central Pacific. Overall activity included 19 named storms, 8 hurricanes, and 2 major hurricanes. The total of named storms was above the 1991–2020 average, while the number of hurricanes was average, and the sum of major hurricanes was below average. The official start date was preceded by the formation of Tropical Storm Andres, the earliest named storm on record in the East Pacific. It was accompanied by Tropical Storm Blanca later in May. The following month included the formations of tropical storms Carlos and Dolores, in addition to Hurricane Enrique. While Carlos remained away from land, Dolores made landfall on the Mexico coastline and Enrique delivered impacts across southwestern sections of the country while it passed just offshore. Above-average seasonal activity continued into July with the development of hurricanes Felicia and Hilda, Tropical Storm Guillermo, and Tropical Depression Nine-E; none of these cyclones impacted land. In August, Hurricane Nora made landfall along the west-central coastline of Mexico. Its formation was preceded by Hurricane Linda and tropical storms Ignacio, Kevin, and Marty, which did not impact land. September marked a stark turn around to the activity of the previous months, as it only featured Olaf, which struck San José del Cabo as a Category 2 hurricane. Two hurricanes – Pamela and Rick – moved ashore the Mexico coastline in October. An additional two storms, Terry and Sandra, developed in November, the fourth consecutive November with at least one named storm. Furthermore, those cyclones existed simultaneously, the first occurrence in the East Pacific during November on record. The Accumulated Cyclone Energy index for the 2021 Pacific hurricane season as calculated by Colorado State University using data from the National Hurricane Center was approximately 94 units, (Note: The total represents the sum of the squares of the maximum sustained wind speed (knots) for every (sub)tropical storm's intensity of over 33 knots (38 mph; 61 km/h), divided by 10,000 while they are above that threshold; therefore, tropical depressions are not included.) about 30 percent below average.

=== Western Pacific Ocean ===
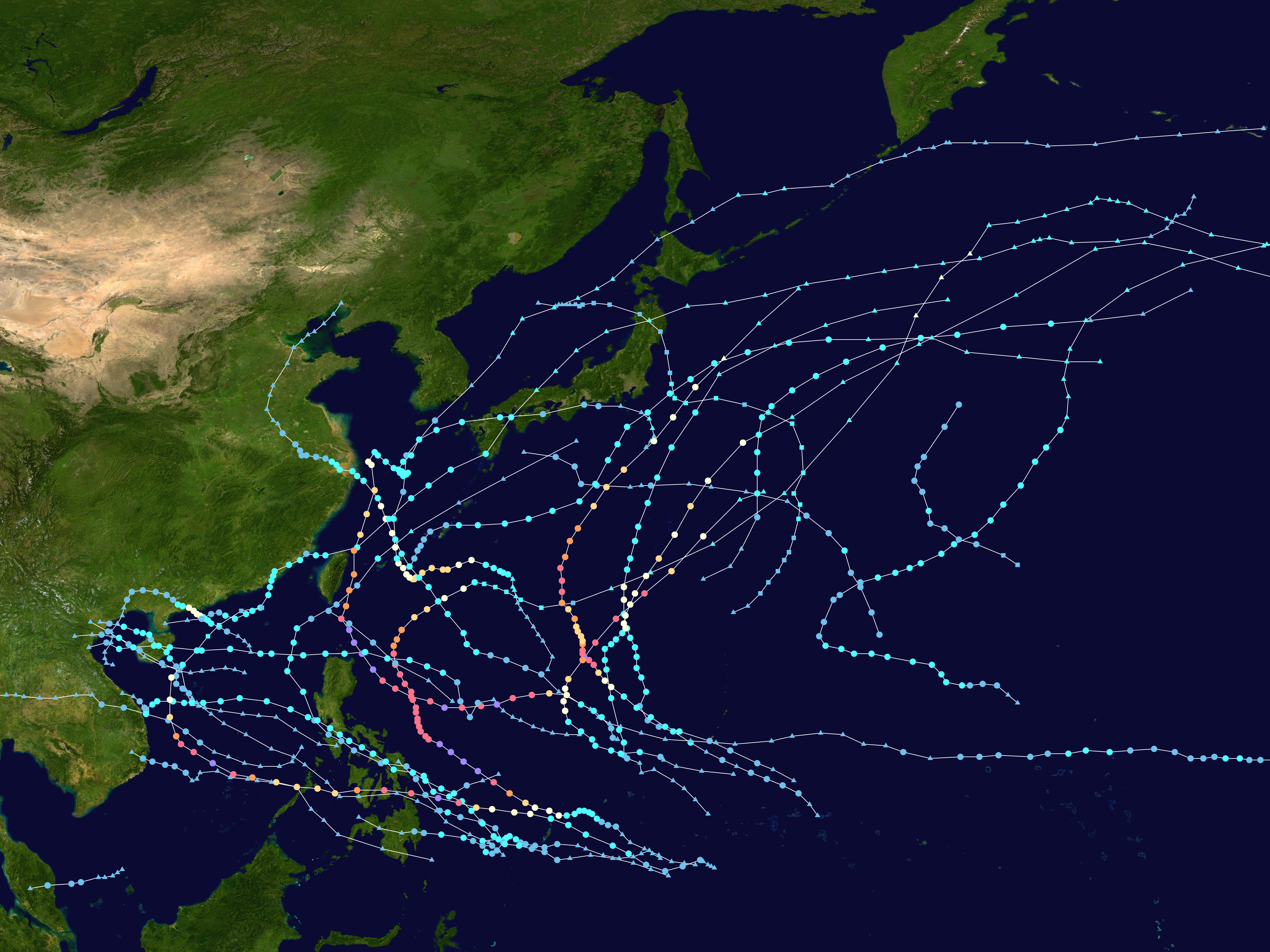
2021 Pacific typhoon season summary map

On January 19, a tropical depression formed, becoming the first Northern Hemisphere tropical cyclone of the year and of the 2021 Pacific typhoon season. It brought minor damage to the Philippines. On February 16, another system formed, with the PAGASA giving it the name Auring and the JTWC designating the system as 01W. On February 17, it was named Dujuan by the JMA. After passing over Palau, it brought minor damage to the Philippines before dissipating on February 22. On March 14, a tropical depression formed near the Sulu Sea, though it was short-lived and it quickly degenerated back into a low-pressure area. On April 12, a tropical depression formed south of Woleai, and on the next day, the JMA upgraded it to a tropical storm, giving it the name Surigae. On April 16, it was given the name Bising by the PAGASA as it entered the Philippine Area of Responsibility. Surigae underwent rapid intensification, becoming the strongest tropical cyclone to form before May in the Northern Hemisphere. After bringing severe damages to the Philippines, it transitioned into an extratropical cyclone on April 24 and dissipated on April 30. On May 12, the JTWC began tracking a tropical depression, giving it the designation 03W with the PAGASA assigning it the local name Crising. It made landfall on the Philippines as a weak tropical storm, however damage was minimal due to the storm's small size. Two tropical depressions formed near Palau on May 29 and May 30 respectively, with the former being assigned the name Choi-wan by the JMA. Choi-wan moved through the Philippines before merging with the Meiyu front on June 4. After a week gap on June 11, another tropical depression formed over the South China Sea and it intensified further to a tropical storm named as Koguma. However, it remained short-lived and made landfall over the nation of Vietnam by the next day and soon dissipated thereafter. After 10 days on June 21, Tropical Storm Champi formed. As a tropical depression, it affected the Mariana Islands and Guam before intensifying into a weak typhoon. It became extratropical on 27 June. A tropical depression with its Filipino name, Emong, formed a couple hundred miles from Mainland China. The storm remained a tropical depression and later dissipated. Another tropical depression formed near Vietnam a couple days later, the storm later made landfall in the country as a weak tropical depression. A tropical depression formed later in the month having the Filipino name Fabian, later intensifying to a tropical storm with the JMA giving it the name In-fa. In-fa later intensified to a typhoon, made several landfalls in China and dissipated on July 31. Meanwhile, Cempaka formed in the South China Sea and made landfall on Southern China and Vietnam causing moderate damage. Later, Tropical Storm Nepartak struck Miyagi Prefecture in Japan. The system had disturbed the ongoing Summer Olympics held in Japan. Nepartak was also the first tropical storm to hit Miyagi since records began in 1951. By the end of July, activities exploded as 8 systems formed within a week however, 5 of them were rather weak and dissipated without becoming tropical storms. The remaining 3 were named Lupit, Nida, and Mirinae. Lupit affected most of East Asia while Nida and Mirinae approached Japan but stayed away from land. Later, a tropical wave from the Central Pacific traveled a long distance and became a tropical storm over the Philippine Sea, which was named Omais (Isang). Omais caused minor damage to The Ryukyu Islands and South Korea. After Omais, the rest of August remained quiet when Conson formed off the coast of the Philippines and became a typhoon in less than 24 hours. Conson struck the Philippines and Vietnam causing severe damage. Then, Chanthu formed and became the second super typhoon of the season. Chanthu then headed over to the East China Sea where the system weakened and stalled. It later made landfall over Kyushu, Japan and dissipated south of the country. On September 21, two new systems formed and was named Dianmu and Mindulle. Dianmu headed over to Vietnam where it made landfall. Meanwhile, following Chanthu, Mindulle rapidly intensified into the season's third super typhoon. Mindulle weakened and strengthened multiple times due to cool dry air and cool sea-surface temperatures. Mindulle eventually passed through Japan's Izu Islands causing minor damage. On the start of October, Tropical storm Lionrock formed east of the Philippines and made landfall on the Chinese Island of Hainan. Soon, two tropical depressions named Maring and Nando formed. However, the two storms eventually merged into Tropical Storm Kompasu due to the storms being close to each other. Kompasu then intensified near typhoon strength and affected the same area where Lionrock had struck. The storm caused severe damage. Later, another tropical depression formed near Wake Island, which was eventually named Namtheun. Namtheun however, stayed away from any landmass and became an extratropical cyclone. On October 23, a tropical depression formed near Guam which then was named Malou. Malou reached its peak as a Category 2 typhoon but it did not effect any land. A day after Malou formed, another tropical depression formed near the Philippines and the JTWC designating the system as 26W. The storm then made landfall over Vietnam and dissipated. In November, Typhon Nyatoh being the only storm of the month formed southeast of Guam and unexpectedly rapidly intensified to a Category 4 super typhoon due to jet interaction. However, it was short lived and the JMA declared the storm became a remnant low. On December, Typhoon Rai formed very late during the season and struck Palau and caused severe destruction in the Philippines. Rai also became a Category 5 super typhoon twice near the Philippines and in the South China Sea. Rai became the first Category 5 super typhoon since Nock-ten to form in the month on December. It was also only the third Category 5 super typhoon recorded in the South China Sea, along with Pamela in 1954 and Rammasun in 2014. Additionally, a tropical depression classified as 29W formed near the equator in the South China Sea. The depression then made landfall on Malaysia, flooding some states within the country.

=== North Indian Ocean ===
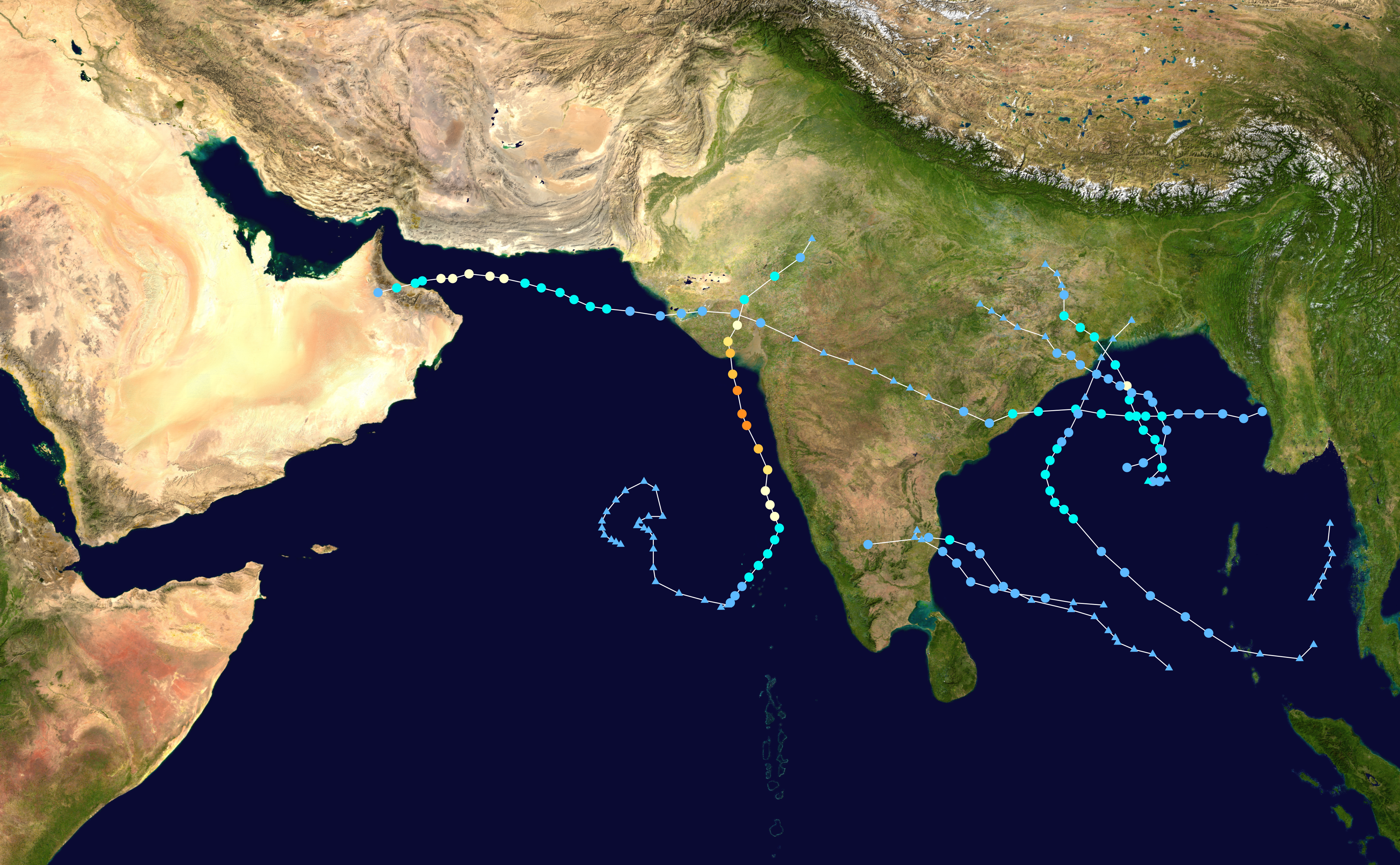
2021 North Indian Ocean cyclone season map

On April 2, a tropical depression formed in the north Andaman Sea near the Myanmar coast. It remained short-lived, however, dissipating the next day. It was the fourth system to form within the first fifteen days of April since the satellite era began in 1960. Formation during this time is considered rare since the first storm of a season usually forms in mid-April or May. A month later, on May 14, another tropical depression formed in the Arabian Sea. Later that day, it intensified into a cyclonic storm, being assigned the name Tauktae by the IMD. It intensified to an extremely severe cyclonic storm and made landfall on Gujarat. Ten days later another tropical depression formed in the Bay of Bengal in May 23, before strengthening into a cyclonic storm and receiving the name Yaas. It rapidly intensified further to a very severe cyclonic storm and made landfall in Odisha. Both of these storms caused considerable loss of lives and damage. On September 12, after a long period of inactivity, BOB 03 formed. BOB 03 intensified to a deep depression, before making landfall in India. It dissipated on September 15. On September 24, a tropical depression formed in the Bay of Bengal. It was designated BOB 04 by the IMD. In the next two days, it intensified into a cyclonic storm and was named Gulab. It made landfall in India. Later, the remnants of Gulab later re-intensified into Shaheen in the Arabian Sea. Shaheen entered the Gulf of Oman, where it became a Severe Cyclonic Storm. However, it struggled to intensify any further, due to lack of convection. Shaheen eventually made landfall near Al Suwaiq in the governorate of Al Batinah North in Oman. Shaheen became the first cyclone to hit the country since Cyclone Hikaa in 2019. It was also the first cyclone to enter the Gulf of Oman since Cyclone Gonu in 2007. On November 7, ARB 03 formed. It stayed out to sea and dissipated two days later. On November 10, a tropical depression formed. It was designated BOB 05 by the IMD. It was short lived, dissipating two days later. However, this depression caused severe flooding in Tamil Nadu and Andhra Pradesh.

=== South-West Indian Ocean ===
==== January - June ====
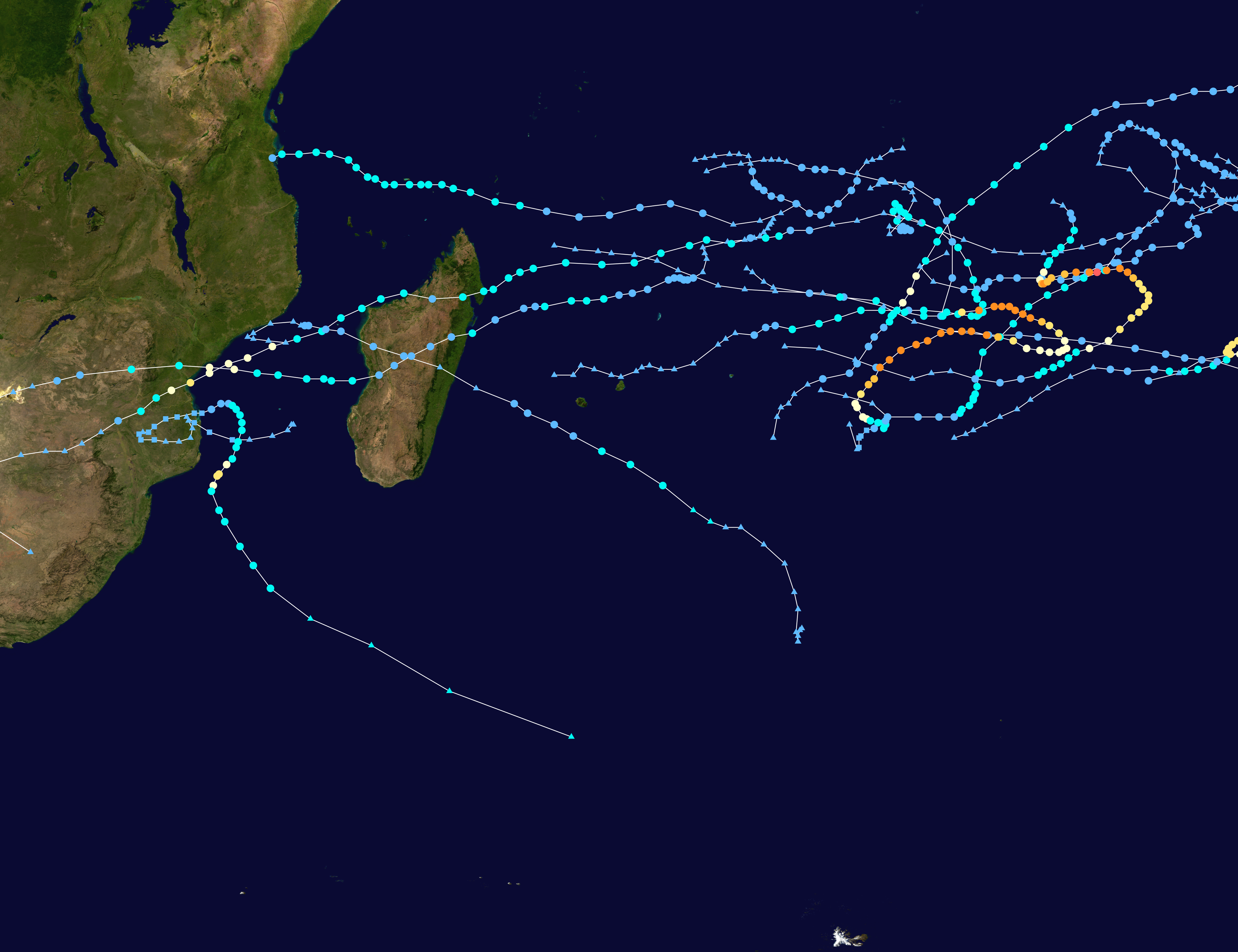
2020–21 South-West Indian Ocean cyclone season

From the 2020 season, two systems crossed into the 2021 season after having formed during the previous year. The systems were Danilo, which peaked as a high-end severe tropical storm and briefly passed near the Mascarene Islands, and a tropical depression designated as 05 which entered the South-West Indian Ocean basin on December 28, causing a Fujiwhara effect with Danilo before dissipating on January 3. In the 2021 season, a tropical disturbance formed in the South-West Indian Ocean, which intensified into a tropical storm, being given the name Eloise. After making landfall on Madagascar, it rapidly intensified into a tropical cyclone in the Mozambique Channel before making a second landfall on Beira. Its remnants affected Zimbabwe, Eswatini, and South Africa. Joshua entered the basin from the Australian Region on the same day. On January 27, 10U from the Australian region entered the basin and was designated as Tropical Depression 09 before quickly dissipating thereafter.

On February 4, a tropical depression formed and intensified into a tropical cyclone named Faraji which further intensified into the season's first intense and very intense tropical cyclone. On February 10, a subtropical depression intensified into a tropical cyclone, being named Guambe and peaking as a Category 2 equivalent tropical cyclone. On March 1, Marian briefly entered the basin before exiting the basin the next day. On March 2, two tropical disturbances formed, and both intensified, being given the names Habana and Iman respectively. While Iman peaked as a moderate tropical storm and then dissipated, Habana continued to intensify and became the season's second intense tropical cyclone. After a short period of inactivity, a tropical depression designated as 15 formed on March 25, though it remained weak and dissipated by March 28.

On April 10, a low-pressure area formed, but due to unfavorable conditions, development was limited. By April 19, the low-pressure area intensified into a tropical depression. The tropical depression intensified shortly into a moderate tropical storm earning the name Jobo. It then rapidly intensified into a tropical cyclone before weakening due to an increase in wind shear, dissipating on April 24. Its remnant made landfall on Tanzania, causing little damages in the area.

==== July - December ====
The South-West Indian Ocean featured no storms forming during the year which became the first since the 1997–98 South-West Indian Ocean cyclone season.

=== Australian region ===
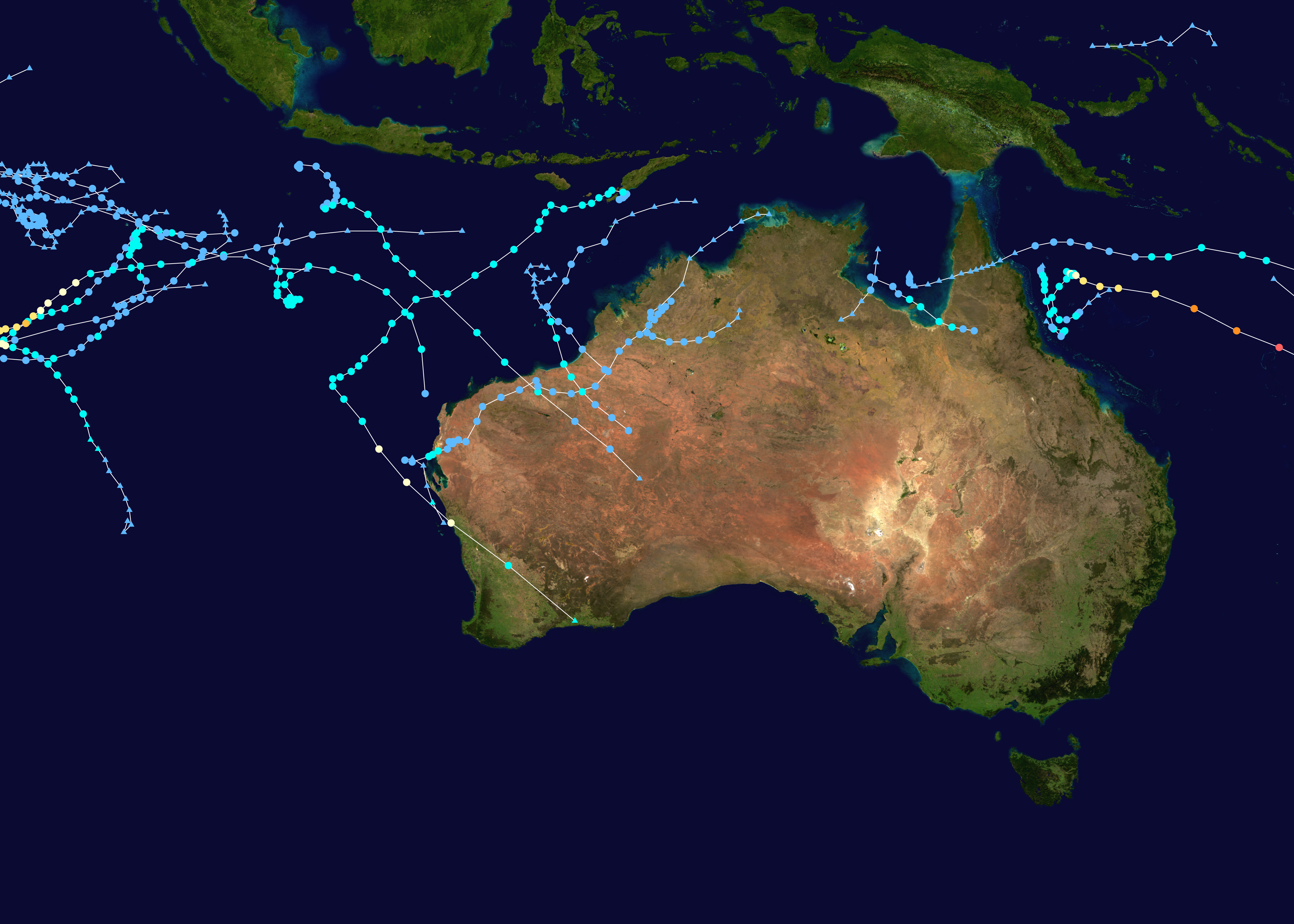
2020–21 Australian region cyclone season summary map

==== January - June ====
At the beginning of the 2021 season, a new tropical low formed in the Australian region near the Northern Territory of Australia, which further intensified into the first named cyclone of 2021, being given the name Imogen before making landfall on Far North Queensland. Another tropical low formed northeast of the Cocos Islands which lasted for five days and dissipated on January 10. Joshua formed on January 13 and crossed into the South-West Indian Ocean basin four days later. A new tropical low formed on January 16 near Queensland, which intensified into a cyclone named Kimi on the next day. Four additional tropical lows formed after Kimi, of which one managed to intensify into Cyclone Lucas before crossing into the South Pacific basin on February 3, while the other three had minor effects on land.

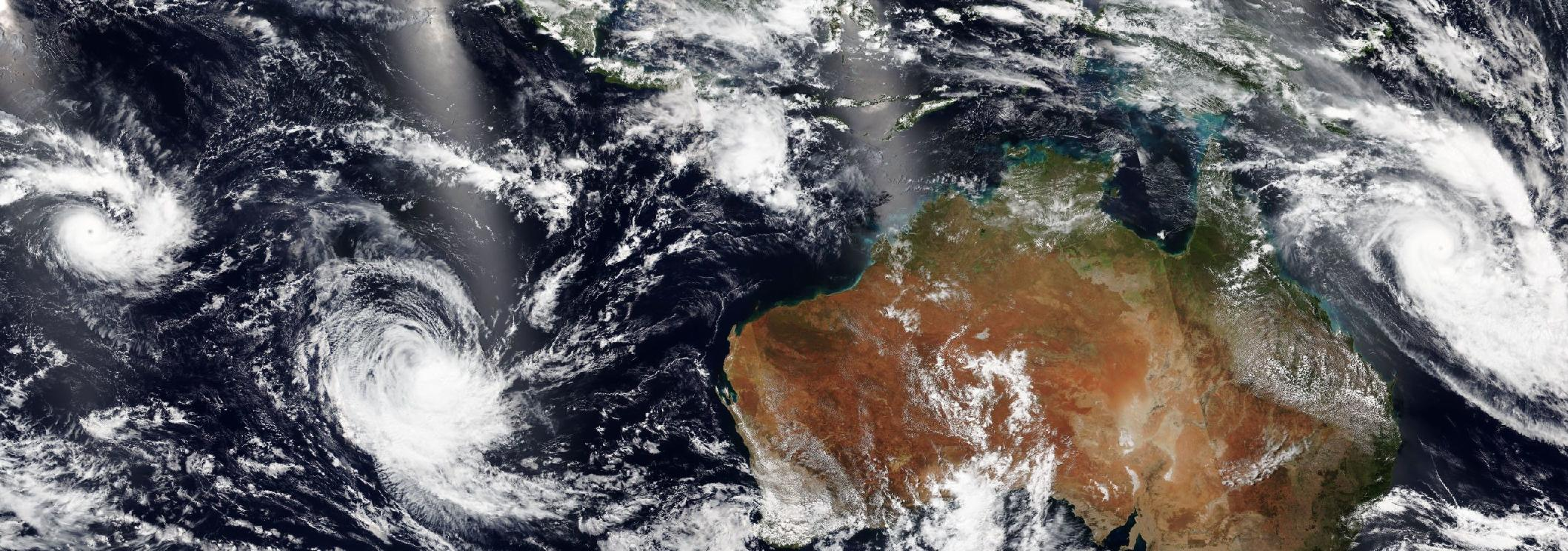
Three tropical cyclones: Habana (left), Marian (middle left) and Niran (right) co-exist in the Southern Hemisphere on March 5.

In the month of February, four tropical disturbances formed out of which two were named, being given the names Marian and Niran respectively. Marian formed on February 23 and rapidly intensified into a Category 3 severe tropical cyclone on the Australian scale. It briefly entered the MFR's area of responsibility between March 1 and March 2 before re-entering into the basin on March 3, where it peaked as a Category 4 severe tropical cyclone on the Australian Scale. Niran formed on February 27 and also rapidly intensified, peaking as a Category 5 severe tropical cyclone. Although it remained offshore, its slow-motion caused damage to banana crops in Queensland. Niran exited the basin on March 5. In March, three tropical lows developed, though they did not intensify into tropical cyclones.

In the month of April, four systems have formed, with two being named Seroja by TCWC Jakarta and Odette by BoM. The two systems engaged in a Fujiwhara interaction, with Seroja eventually absorbing Odette. The former would go on to intensify and strike Australia as a Category 3 severe tropical cyclone. On April 9, a tropical low formed off the east coast of Australia and quickly exited on the same day. On April 23, a late-season tropical low formed to the east of the Arafura Sea. On May 31 a very rare tropical low formed near the Cocos Islands and dissipated without any significant intensification on 4 June.

==== July - December ====
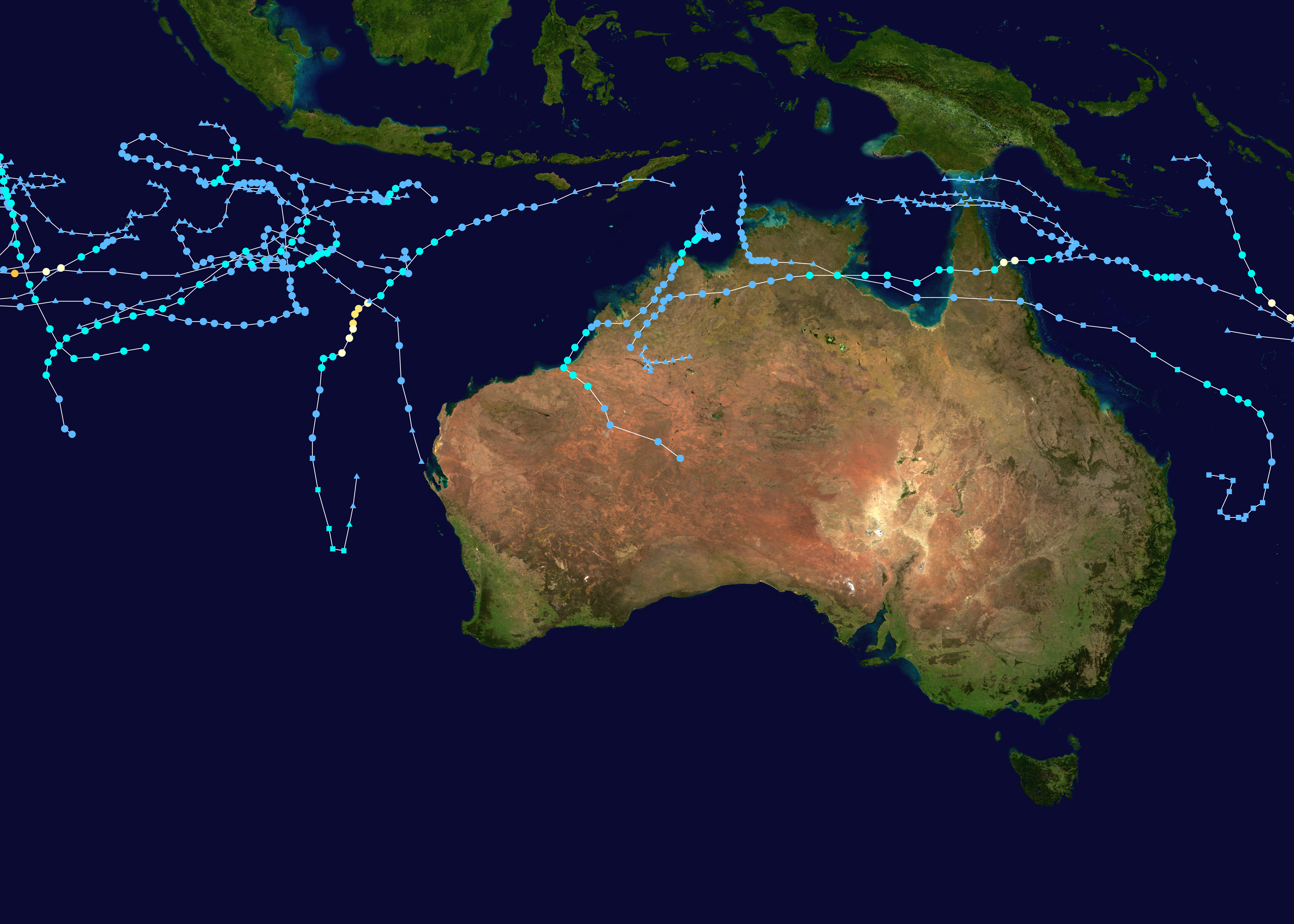
2021–22 Australian region cyclone season summary map

On November 10, a tropical low formed near the island of Sumatra. However the storm dissipated a few days later. On November 17, another low formed which then formed into Paddy. Following Paddy, another depression formed near the Cocos Islands before exiting the basin. On November 29, Teratai formed south of Java Island however the cyclone struggled to develop due to the lack of sufficient outflow.

Ruby became a named storm on December 12, and intensified to category 1-equivalent strength before crossing into the South Pacific basin on December 13.

=== South Pacific Ocean ===
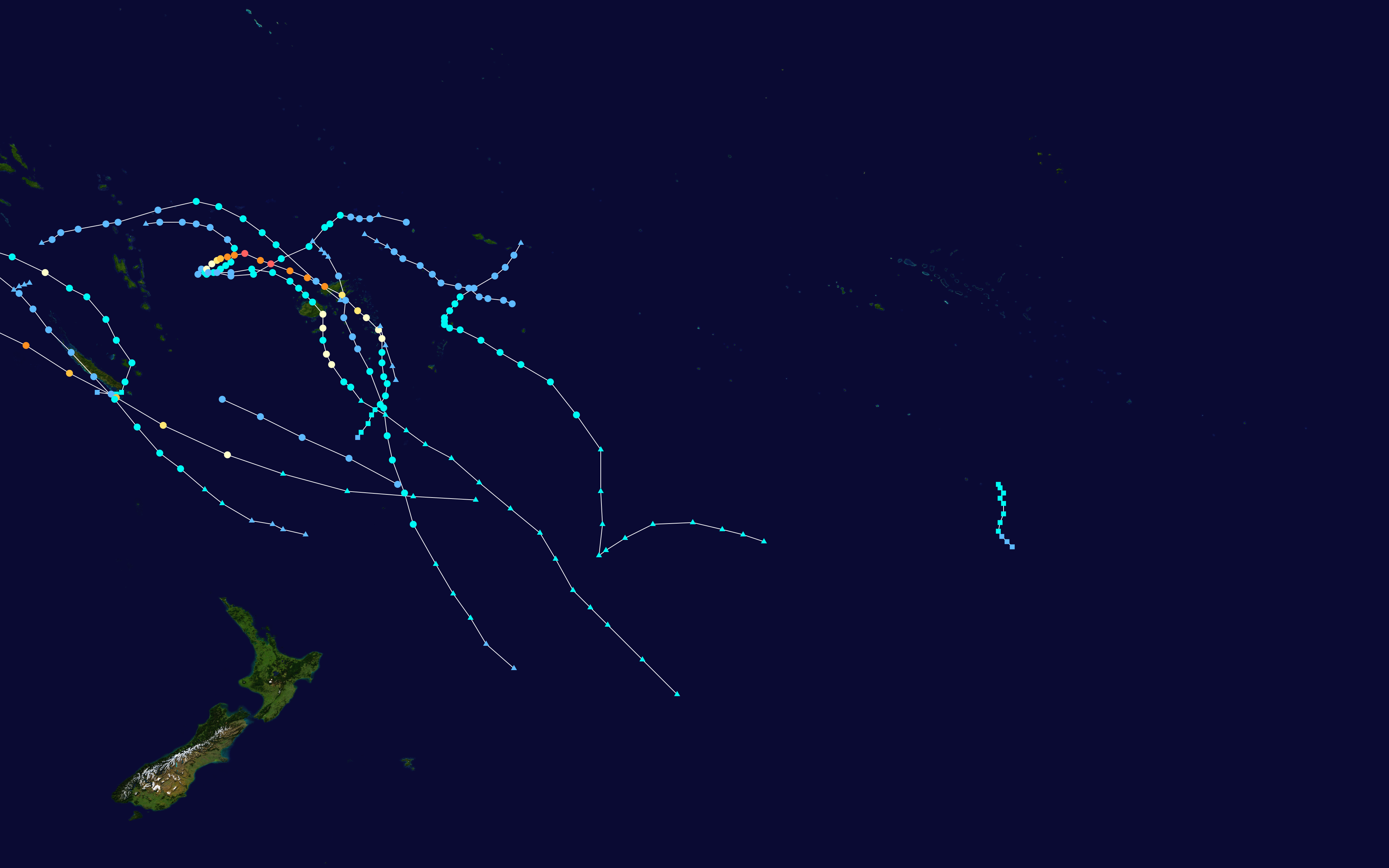
2020–21 South Pacific cyclone season summary map

==== January - June ====
In January 2021, four tropical disturbances formed in the South Pacific, all four of which intensified into tropical depressions, with Ana and Bina intensifying into tropical cyclones. On February 1, Lucas entered from the Australian region and affected New Caledonia and Vanuatu. A tropical depression designated as 09F formed on February 7, before it was upgraded into a tropical storm by the JTWC. However, it accelerated southwards and became extratropical on February 11. Another tropical depression designated as 10F formed on February 22, before dissipating on February 24. Niran entered the basin on March 5 and caused extensive damage in New Caledonia before accelerating southeast as it transitioned into an extratropical cyclone. On March 5, a short-lived tropical depression designated as 11F existed from March 5 to March 6. On April 9, a tropical depression designated as 13F entered the basin, however, it dissipated on April 11 without intensifying into a tropical cyclone.

==== July - December ====
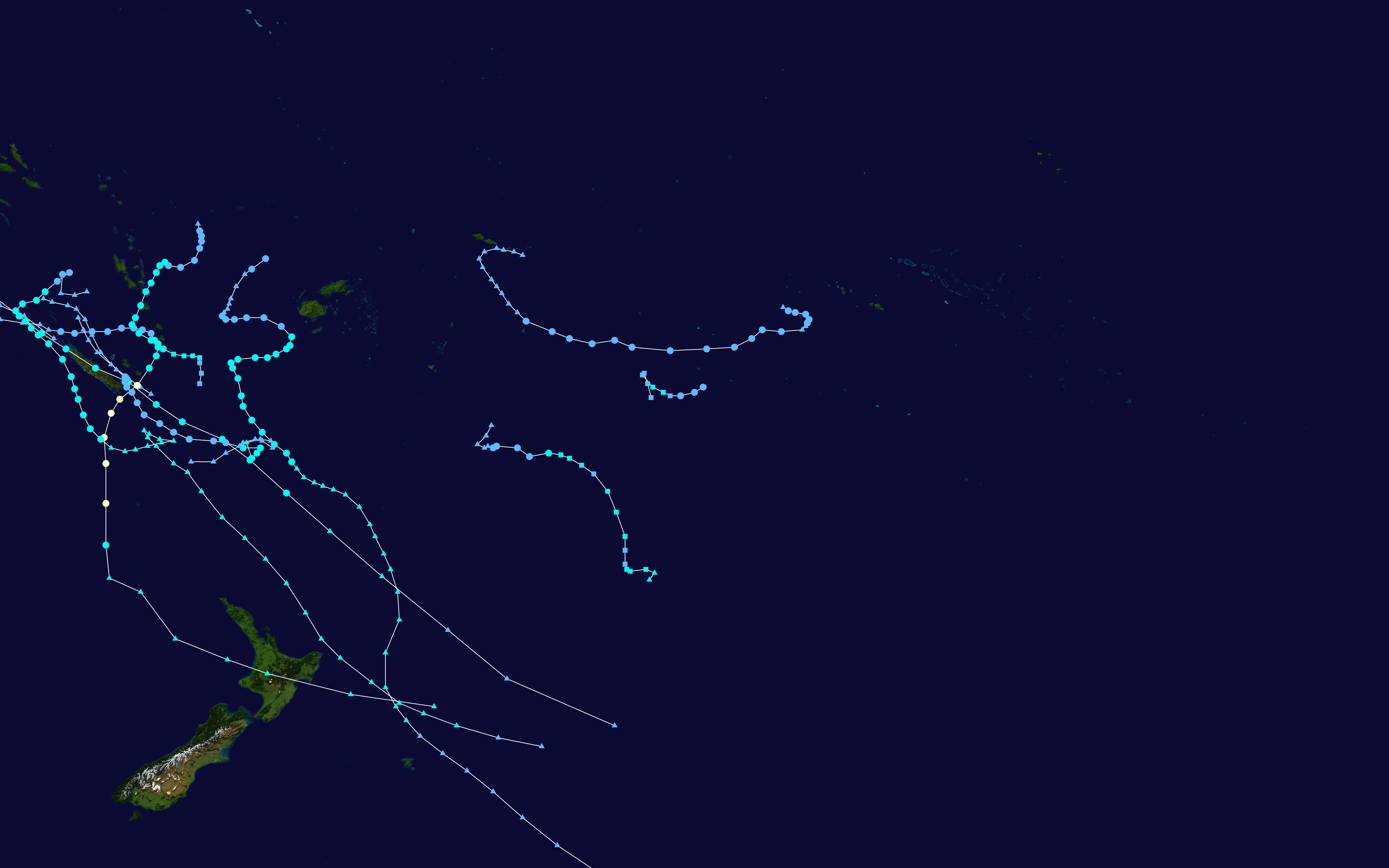
2021–22 South Pacific cyclone season summary map

On December 13, the basin's first storm started off with Ruby, which entered the basin from the Australian basin as a Category 2 tropical cyclone on the Australian scale. Ruby eventually made landfall over New Caledonia.

=== South Atlantic Ocean ===
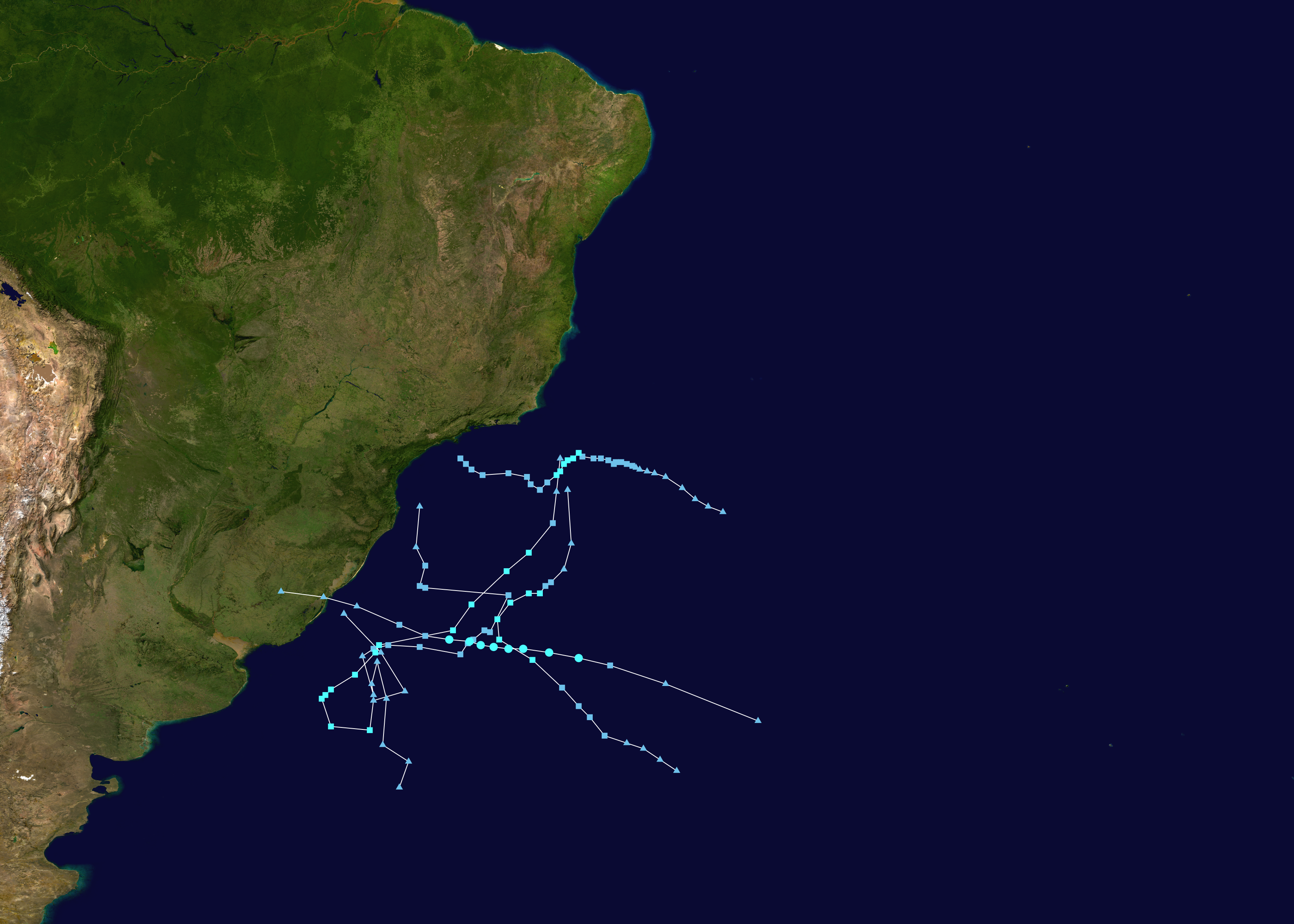
Summary map of all 5 tropical or subtropical cyclones that formed in the South Atlantic during 2021

On February 6, a weak system unofficially designated as 01Q was briefly tracked by the NOAA. The system formed and dissipated on the same day without being monitored by the Brazilian Navy. Another system formed on February 14 near Rio Grande do Sul, being designated as a subtropical depression by the Brazilian Navy. On April 19, a subtropical depression formed, although its precursor formed off the coast of Rio de Janeiro. On April 20 the subtropical depression gained strength and was classified as a subtropical storm by the Brazilian Navy, being assigned the name Potira. It brought gale-force winds to Copacabana. On June 28, an extratropical cyclone in Uruguay transitioned into a subtropical depression on the evening of the same day, being given the designation Invest 1N by the NOAA. A day later, the storm strengthened into a subtropical storm. On June 29, as the subtropical storm entered Brazilian maritime territory, the Brazilian Navy named it Raoni. On December 10, a subtropical cyclone evolved into a subtropical depression and on the morning of the same day it turned into a subtropical storm, called Ubá by the Brazilian Navy. In total, a record-breaking five tropical or subtropical cyclones formed in the South Atlantic in 2021, marking a highly unusually active period for the basin.

=== Mediterranean Sea ===
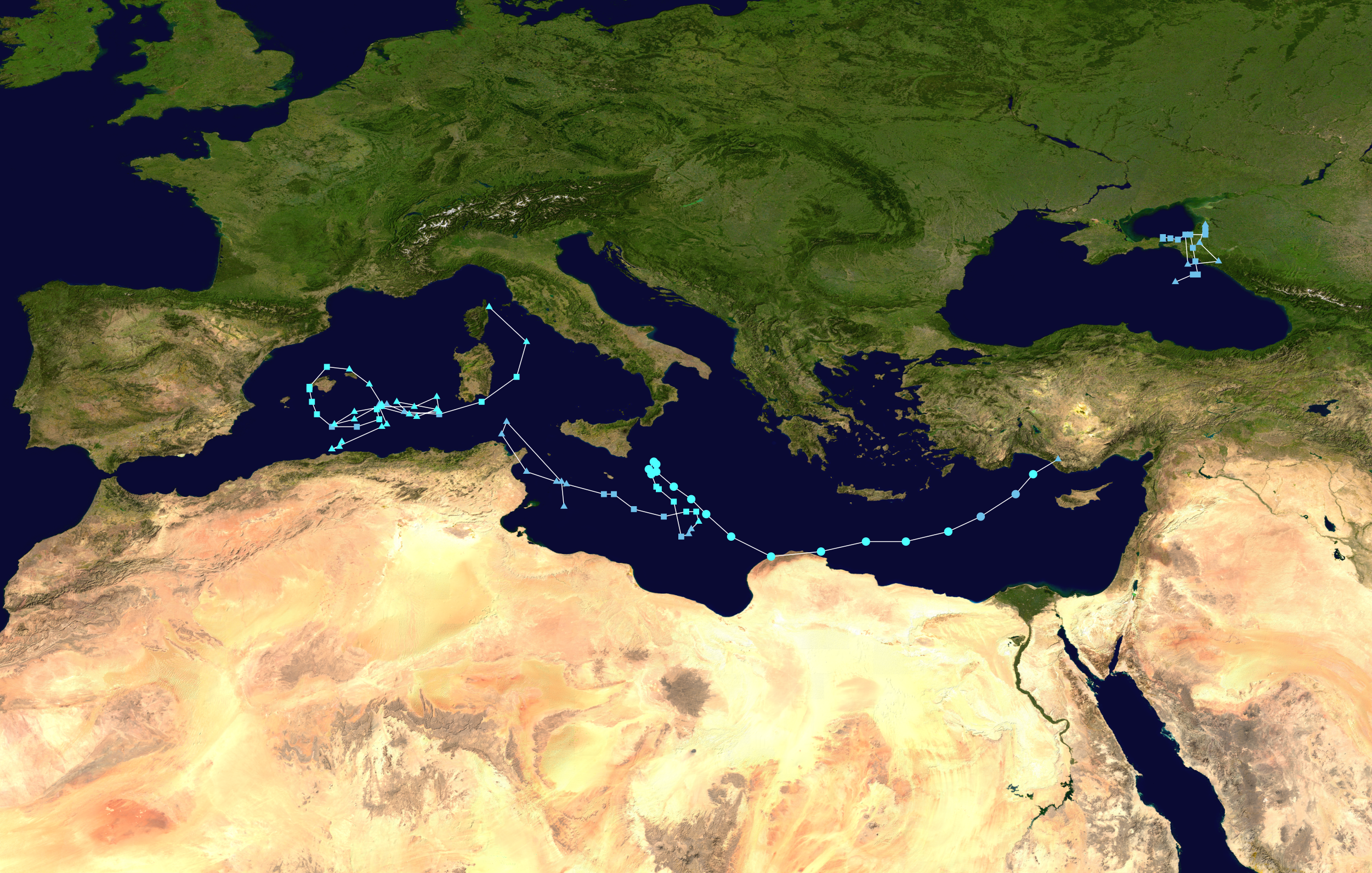
Summary map of all Mediterranean tropical-like cyclones that formed during 2021

Three tropical-like systems formed in the Mediterranean basin in 2021. Falchion, a subtropical depression, meandered over the Black and Azov seas in mid-August. Cyclones Apollo and Blas formed in rapid succession in October and November, respectively, both of which caused significant impacts to many European countries.

== Systems ==
=== January ===
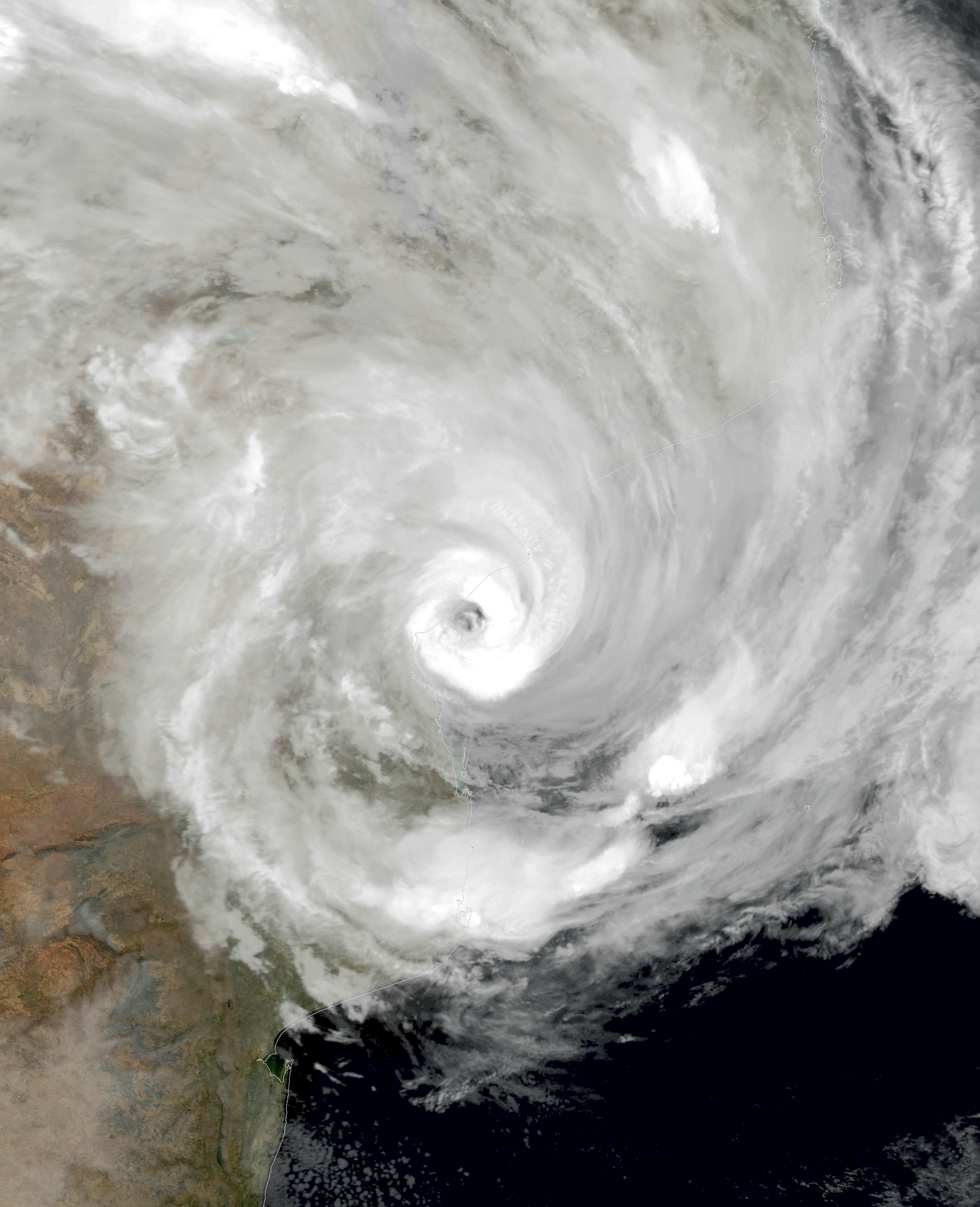
Cyclone Eloise

January was unusually above-average, with fourteen tropical cyclones forming and seven being named. Before that, two systems crossed into the 2021 season after having formed during the previous year. Danilo was one of the systems that crossed over, peaking as a severe tropical storm and briefly passing near the Mascarene Islands. A tropical depression designated as 05 entered the South-West Indian Ocean basin on December 28 and caused a brief interaction with Danilo before dissipating on January 3. In the Australian region, Cyclone Imogen formed on January 1 and affected Far North Queensland, bringing minimal damage to the area. Following Imogen, Cyclone Joshua, Cyclone Kimi, and Cyclone Lucas developed, with Joshua later entering the South-West Indian Ocean on January 17. Kimi threatened to strike the coast of Queensland, but weakened suddenly due to unexpected wind shear, remaining just offshore instead. Lucas formed on January 25 and entered the South Pacific basin on February 1. Additionally, four tropical lows formed in the basin, out of which one system entered the South-West Indian Ocean basin. In the South-West Indian Ocean, Cyclone Eloise formed and first made landfall on Madagascar as a severe tropical storm. It rapidly intensified over the Mozambique Channel and became the strongest storm of the month shortly before making a damaging landfall on Mozambique, with its remnants entering Zimbabwe, Eswatini, and South Africa. In the South Pacific, two tropical depressions formed, which were later assigned the names Ana and Bina, both of them affected Fiji and Vanuatu. In the West Pacific, a tropical depression formed, which became the first Northern Hemisphere tropical cyclone of 2021 and also marked the beginning of the 2021 Pacific typhoon season.

Tropical cyclones formed in January 2021
Storm name	Dates active	Max wind km/h (mph)	Pressure (hPa)	Areas affected	Damage (USD)	Deaths	Refs
Imogen	January 1 – 6	85 (50)	989	Far North Queensland, Northern Territory	$10 million	None	
06U	January 5 – 10	65 (40)	1002	None	None	None	
Joshua	January 13 – 19	85 (50)	991	Cocos Islands	None	None	
Eloise	January 14 – 25	150 (90)	967	Madagascar, Mozambique, Malawi, Zimbabwe, South Africa, Eswatini	$97 million	27	
08U	January 15 – 23	65 (40)	998	Northern Territory, Western Australia	None	None	
Kimi	January 16 – 19	100 (65)	987	Queensland	None	None	
09	January 19 – 28	75 (45)	995	Cocos Islands	None	None	
TD	January 19 – 20	Unknown	1008	Philippines	$13.2 million	3	
04F	January 22 – 28	Unknown	999	Vanuatu	None	None	
Lucas	January 25 – February 3	110 (70)	975	Far North Queensland, Northern Territory, New Caledonia, Vanuatu	Unknown	2	
Ana	January 26 – February 8	120 (75)	970	Fiji	$10 million	1	
06F	January 27 – 28	Unknown	998	Fiji	None	None	
12U	January 28 – February 5	55 (35)	992	Northern Territory, Western Australia	None	None	
Bina	January 29 – 31	65 (40)	995	Vanuatu	None	None	

=== February ===
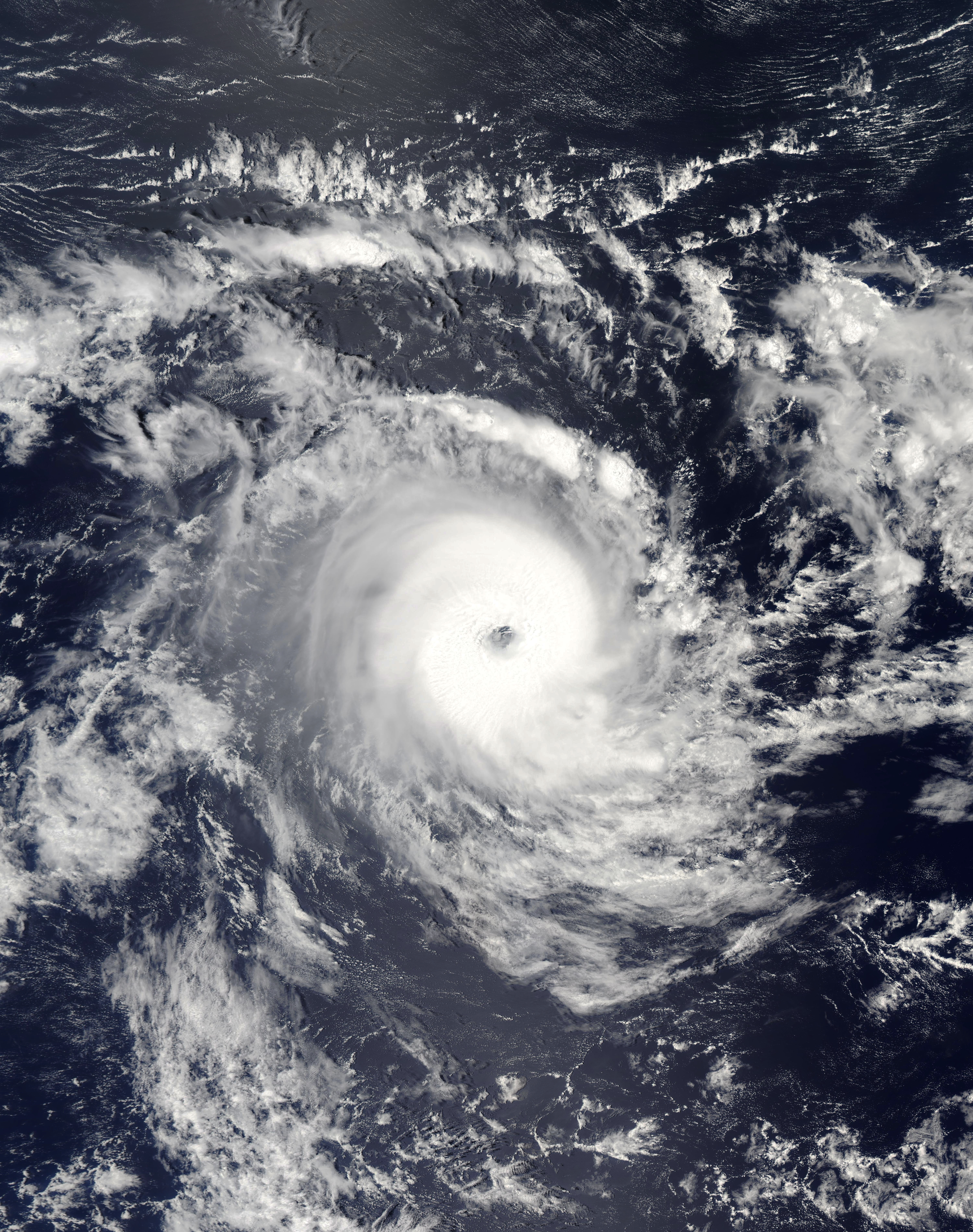
Cyclone Faraji, the strongest cyclone this month in terms of maximum sustained winds.

Cyclone Niran, the strongest cyclone this month in terms of minimum barometric pressure.

February was slightly above-average, featuring eleven systems, of which five were named. One system was unofficial and another was subtropical. In the Australian region, two tropical lows formed on February 6 and 18 respectively. Cyclone Marian formed on February 23 and rapidly intensified, reaching Category 3-equivalent strength on February 28 with Niran following on February 27 and reaching Category 5 strength on both the Australian scale and the Saffir–Simpson scale, bringing impacts to Queensland and New Caledonia. In the South Pacific, a tropical depression formed north of Fiji and strengthened, though it accelerated southwards and became extratropical on February 11. Another tropical disturbance also briefly existed from February 22 to 24. In the South-West Indian Ocean, Cyclone Faraji formed and rapidly intensified, being classified as a very intense tropical cyclone before becoming the strongest storm of the month as it strengthened into the first Category 5-equivalent tropical cyclone in the basin since Cyclone Ambali in 2019. It also became the first very intense tropical cyclone recorded in the month of February. It then began to gradually weaken, dissipating on February 13. Another system formed on February 10 and made landfall on Mozambique before re-emerging back over water, and was given the name Guambe before reaching tropical cyclone status. In the Western Pacific, Tropical Storm Dujuan formed and became the basin's first named storm, bringing minor damage to the Philippines. In the South Atlantic, one system was unofficially monitored by NOAA, being given the unofficial designation of 01Q. However, the Brazilian Navy did not monitor the system. Another system formed near Rio Grande do Sul and was designated as a subtropical depression by the Brazilian Navy.

Tropical cyclones formed in February 2021
Storm name	Dates active	Max wind km/h (mph)	Pressure (hPa)	Areas affected	Damage (USD)	Deaths	Refs
Faraji	February 4 – 13	220 (140)	935	None	None	None	
01Q	February 6	65 (40)	990	None	None	None	
13U	February 6 – 7	Unknown	996	Northern Territory	None	None	
09F	February 7 – 11	55 (35)	991	Fiji, Tonga, Wallis and Futuna	None	None	
Guambe	February 10 – 21	155 (100)	953	Mozambique	None	None	
#01-2021	February 14 – 17	55 (35)	1002	Rio Grande do Sul	None	None	
Dujuan (Auring)	February 16 – 23	75 (45)	996	Palau, Philippines	$3.29 million	1	
TL	February 18 – 23	Unknown	1002	Northern Territory	None	None	
Marian	February 21 – March 9	155 (100)	955	Christmas Island, Cocos Islands	None	None	
10F	February 22 – 24	Unknown	1003	Niue, Samoan Islands, Tonga, Wallis and Futuna	None	None	
Niran	February 27 – March 6	205 (125)	931	Far North Queensland, New Caledonia, Northern Territory	>$250 million	None	

=== March ===
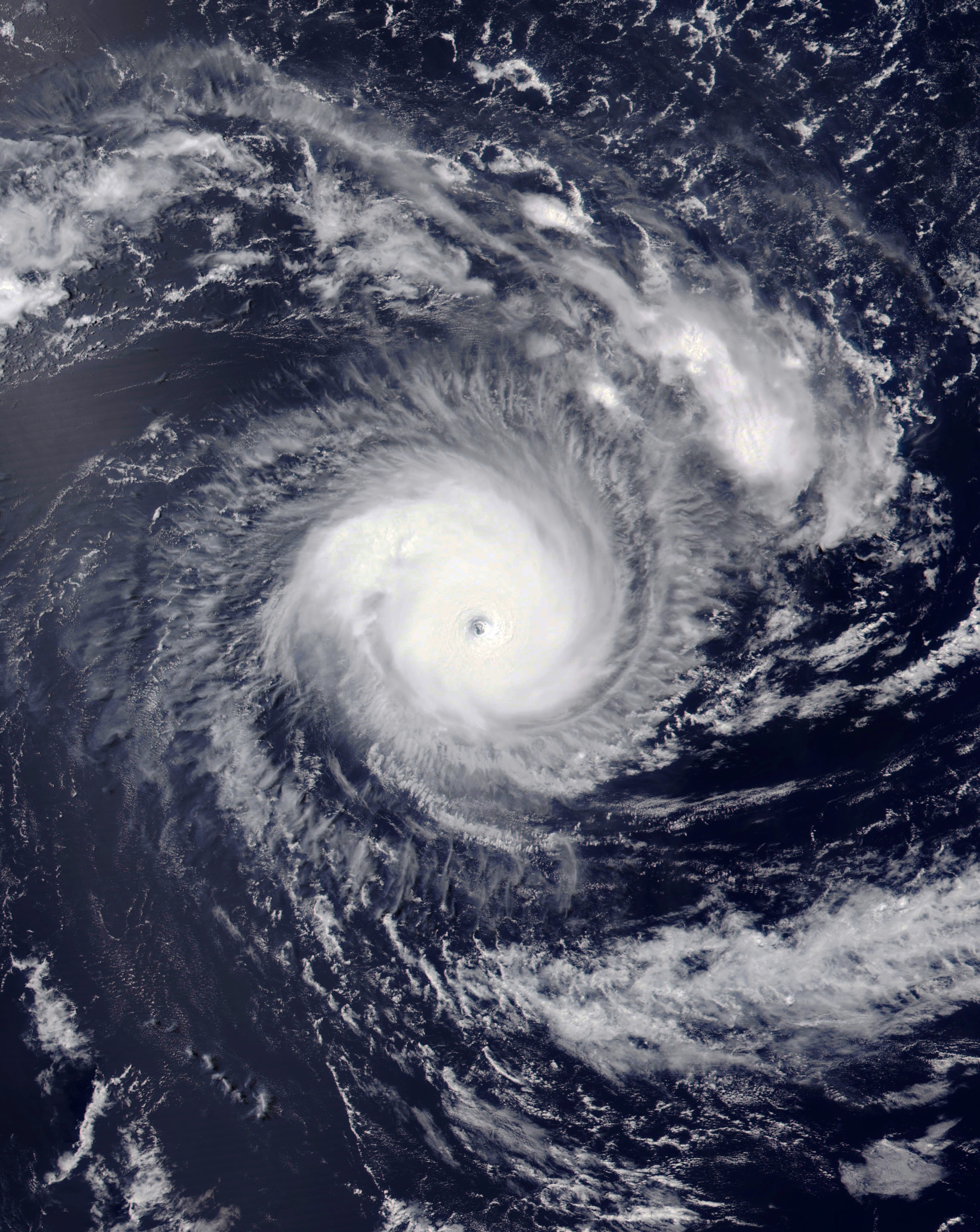
Cyclone Habana

March was slightly below-average, featuring nine tropical cyclones with only two being named. In the Australian region, five tropical lows formed on March 10, 18, 21, and 29 respectively. In the South Pacific, a tropical depression formed and was designated as 11F, though it was short-lived, dissipating the next day. In the South-West Indian Ocean, Habana formed and explosively intensified to an intense tropical cyclone, persisting for two weeks and reaching three individual peak intensities. Forming along with Habana was Tropical Storm Iman, which made landfall on Madagascar as a tropical depression and bringing heavy rainfall to Réunion, dissipating a few days later. In the West Pacific, a tropical depression formed on March 14, however it was short-lived, dissipating the same day.

Tropical cyclones formed in March 2021
Storm name	Dates active	Max wind km/h (mph)	Pressure (hPa)	Areas affected	Damage (USD)	Deaths	Refs
Habana	March 2 – 16	220 (140)	935	None	None	None	
Iman	March 2 – 8	65 (40)	996	Madagascar, Mauritius, Réunion	Unknown	None	
11F	March 5 – 6	Unknown	1001	None	None	None	
18U	March 10 – 15	Unknown	Unknown	None	None	None	
TD	March 14	Unknown	1006	Philippines	None	None	
19U	March 18 – 21	Unknown	Unknown	Western Australia	None	None	
20U	March 18 – 20	Unknown	Unknown	Northern Territory	None	None	
21U	March 21 – 26	Unknown	Unknown	None	None	None	
15	March 25 – 28	55 (35)	998	None	None	None	

=== April ===
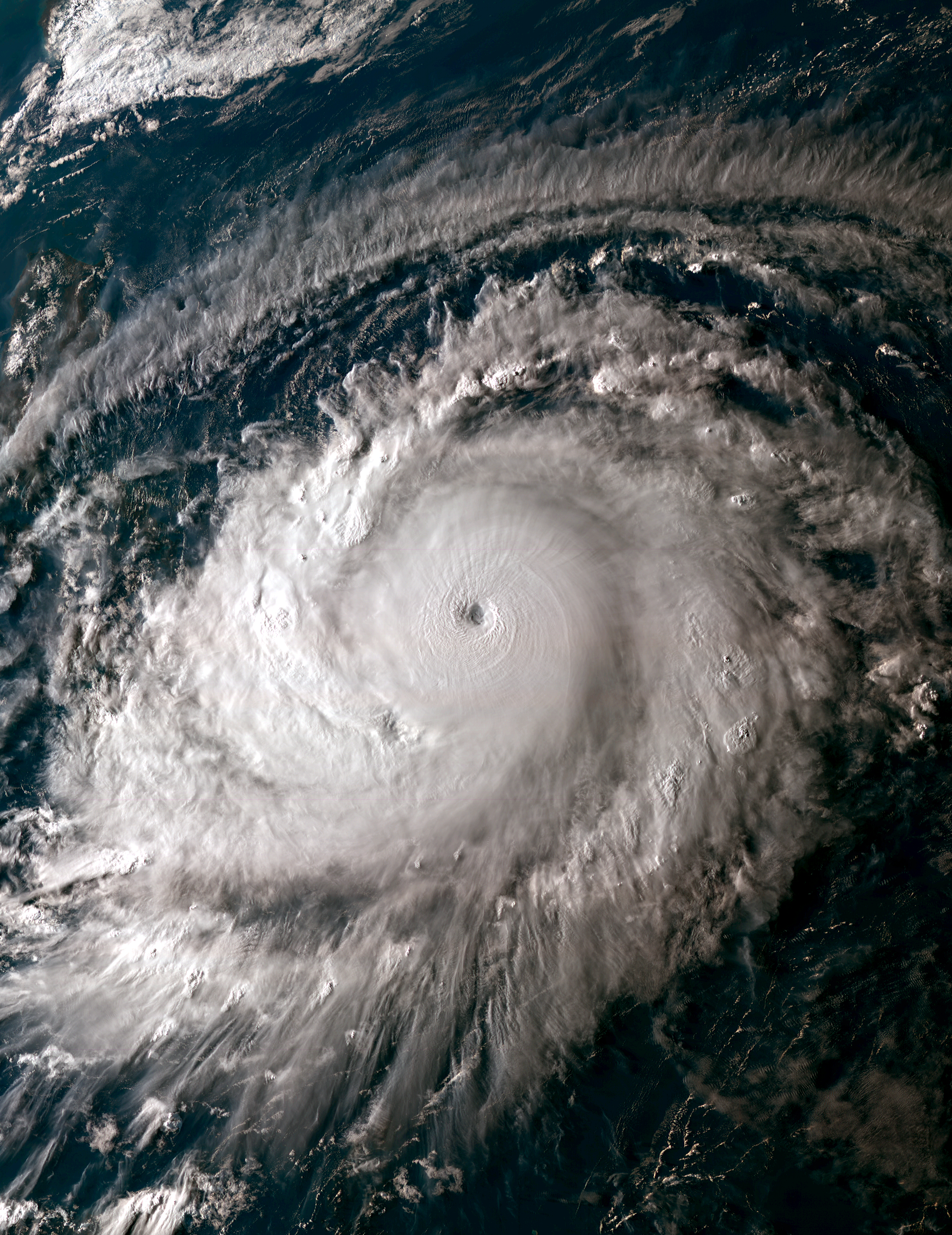
Typhoon Surigae

April was above-average, featuring nine systems, of which five were named. In the Australian region, Cyclone Seroja formed near East Timor and Indonesia. Its precursor caused catastrophic damage and deadly landslides in the West Nusa Tenggara and East Nusa Tenggara provinces of Indonesia and East Timor, causing 229 fatalities before strengthening to a Category 3 severe tropical cyclone and making a rare landfall on Midwestern Australia, becoming the first since Elaine in 1999. Odette also formed in the region near the Cocos Islands before undergoing a Fujiwhara interaction with Seroja quickly after its formation and later being absorbed by it. Additionally, two tropical lows formed on April 7 and April 9, of which one entered the South Pacific basin. In the North Indian Ocean, a short-lived tropical depression formed off the Myanmar coast in the north Andaman Sea, however it dissipated the next day. In the Australian region, a tropical low formed before later moving into the South Pacific basin, being designated as 13F; it was short-lived and dissipated on April 11. In the South-West Indian Ocean, Cyclone Jobo developed near the Seychelles, undergoing a brief period of rapid intensification before dissipating near Tanzania on April 24. In the West Pacific, Typhoon Surigae formed south of Woleai and rapidly intensified into a Category 5-equivalent typhoon, becoming the strongest typhoon recorded in the month of April as it passed near the Philippines, and the strongest tropical cyclone of 2021. In the South Atlantic, Subtropical Storm Potira formed just off the coast of Rio de Janeiro, causing gale-force winds in Copacabana.

Tropical cyclones formed in April 2021
Storm name	Dates active	Max wind km/h (mph)	Pressure (hPa)	Areas affected	Damage (USD)	Deaths	Refs
BOB 01	April 2 – 3	45 (30)	1000	Andaman and Nicobar Islands, Myanmar	None	None	
Seroja	April 3 – 12	120 (75)	971	East Nusa Tenggara, East Timor, Western Australia, West Nusa Tenggara	> $491 million	229	
Odette	April 3 – 10	85 (50)	988	Christmas Island	None	None	
24U	April 7 – 11	Unknown	Unknown	None	None	None	
13F	April 9 – 11	Unknown	1001	None	None	None	
Surigae (Bising)	April 12 – 19	220 (140)	895	Okinawa Prefecture, Palau, Philippines, Russia, Sulawesi, Taiwan, Yap State	> $10.5 million	9	
Potira	April 18 – 24	75 (45)	1006	Rio de Janeiro	None	None	
Jobo	April 23 – 27	120 (75)	985	Madagascar, Seychelles, Tanzania	Unknown	22	
TL	April 23 – 24	Unknown	1009	None	None	None	

=== May ===
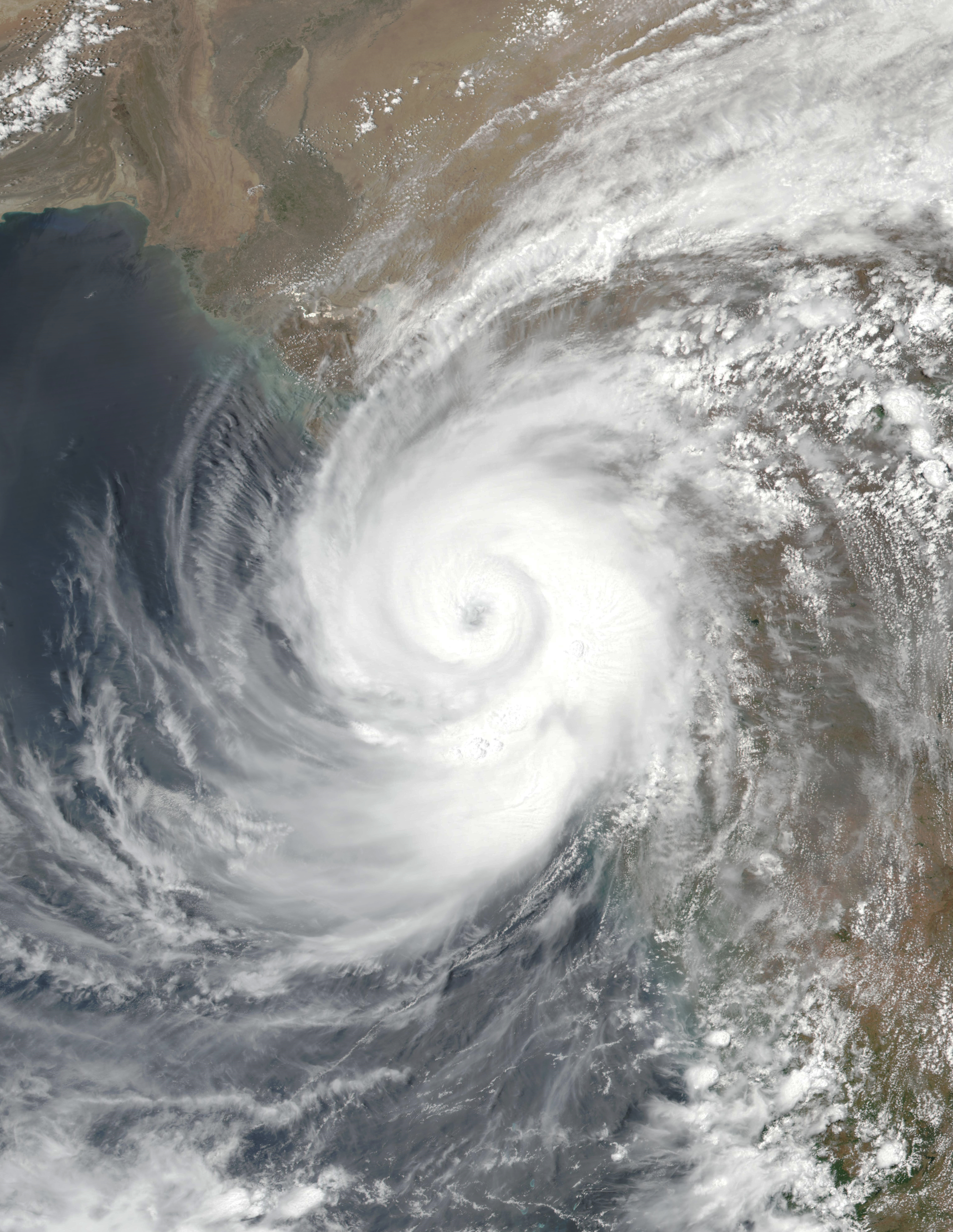
Cyclone Tauktae

May was well above average, even though tropical cyclogenesis started in mid-May. It featured the formation of nine systems, with six being named. In the Australian region near the Cocos Islands, an off-season tropical low formed before dissipating on June 3. In the East Pacific, Tropical Storm Andres formed and peaked as a tropical storm, becoming the earliest named storm in the basin in the East Pacific east of 140°W, breaking the previous record of Adrian in 2017 by twelve hours. Tropical Storm Blanca also formed and peaked as a tropical storm near the end of the month. In the North Atlantic, Tropical Storm Ana formed northeast of Bermuda as a subtropical storm before later transitioning into a tropical storm, marking the seventh consecutive Atlantic hurricane season to feature a storm formed before the official start date. In the North Indian Ocean, Cyclone Tauktae formed off the coast of Kerala and Lakshadweep and rapidly intensified to Category 4 equivalent storm, becoming the strongest storm of the month. It made a devastating landfall in Gujarat. Ten days later, Cyclone Yaas formed in the Bay of Bengal and intensified into a Category 1 equivalent strength, eventually making landfall in northwestern Odisha on May 26. Both storms brought considerable damage and loss of lives. In the West Pacific, a tropical depression formed on May 12 before making landfall on the Philippines and dissipating shortly thereafter. Tropical Storm Choi-wan and a tropical depression also formed later in the month, with Choi-wan peaking as a tropical storm. Choi-wan made several landfalls in the Philippines, causing severe damage. It later weakened into a tropical depression before transitioning into an extratropical cyclone.

Tropical cyclones formed in May 2021
Storm name	Dates active	Max wind km/h (mph)	Pressure (hPa)	Areas affected	Damage (USD)	Deaths	Refs
Andres	May 9 – 11	65 (40)	1005	State of Mexico	None	None	
03W (Crising)	May 12 – 14	55 (35)	1002	Philippines	$486,000	None	
Tauktae	May 14 – 19	185 (115)	950	Dadra and Nagar Haveli and Daman and Diu, Gujarat, Goa, Maharashtra, Karnataka, Kerala, Lakshadweep, Maldives, Delhi, Rajasthan, Haryana, Sindh, Sri Lanka	$2.25 billion	174	
Ana	May 22 – 24	75 (45)	1004	Bermuda	None	None	
Yaas	May 23 – 28	140 (85)	970	Andaman and Nicobar Islands, Bangladesh, Bihar, Jharkhand, Nepal, Odisha, Uttar Pradesh, West Bengal	$2.99 billion	20	
Choi-wan (Dante)	May 29 – June 5	75 (45)	998	Palau, Philippines, Taiwan	$6.39 million	11	
TD	May 30 – 31	Unknown	1006	None	None	None	
Blanca	May 30 – June 4	95 (60)	998	None	None	None	
TL	May 31 – June 3	Unknown	Unknown	None	None	None	

=== June ===
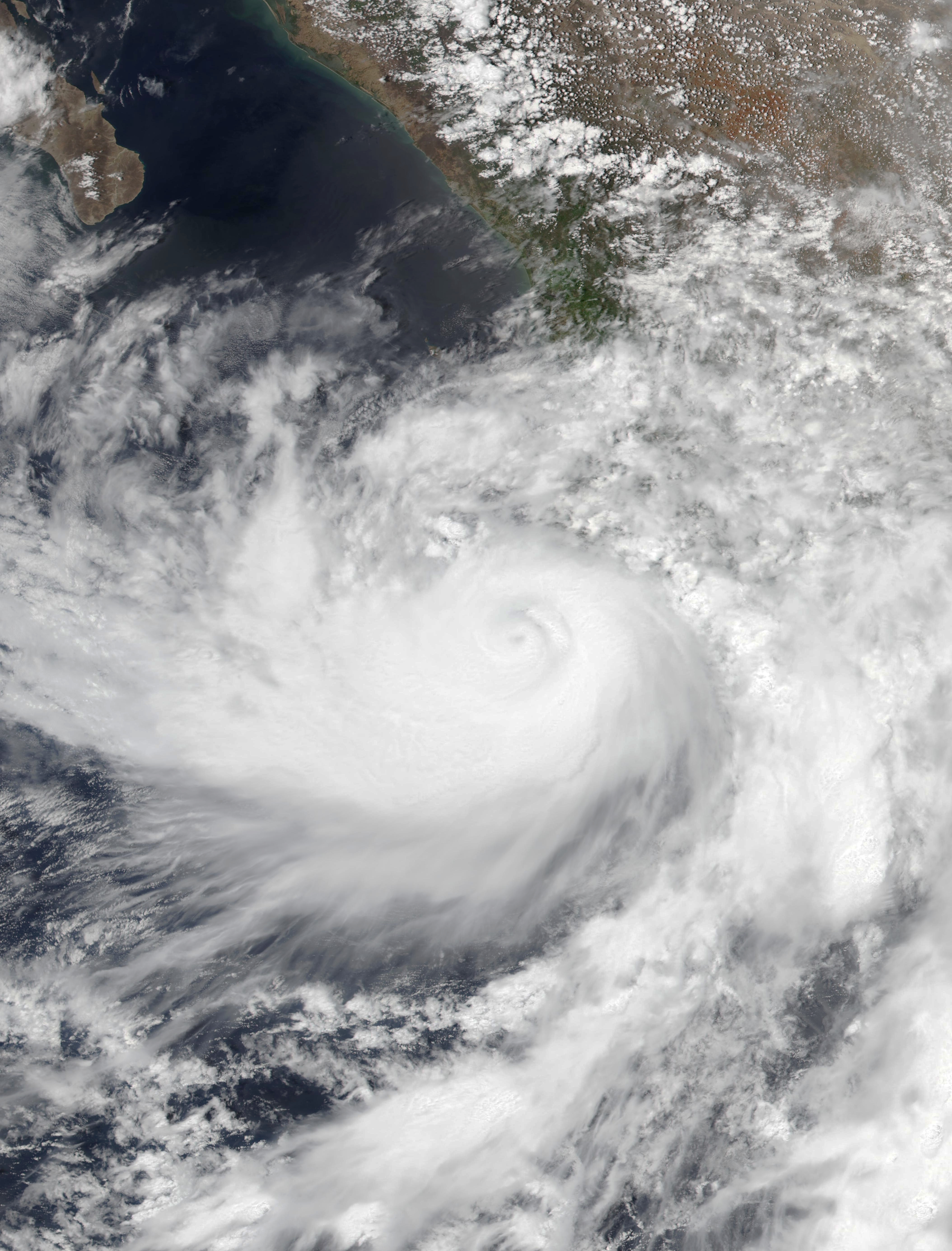
Hurricane Enrique

June was a slightly above average-month, featuring the formation of ten tropical cyclones with nine being named. In the East Pacific, Tropical Storm Carlos, Tropical Storm Dolores and Hurricane Enrique formed, with Dolores making landfall near the border between Michoacán and Colima in Mexico near hurricane strength, killing 3 people, while Enrique intensified to a hurricane in a similar location to Dolores later in the month, becoming the strongest storm of the month. In the North Atlantic, Tropical Storm Bill formed off the coast of North Carolina, Tropical Storm Claudette formed over southeastern Louisiana and brought heavy rain and severe weather to the Southeastern United States, while Tropical Storm Danny formed off the coast of South Carolina late in the month, tying the Atlantic for the most active June. In the North Atlantic, Hurricane Elsa formed, becoming the earliest fifth-named storm on record and beating the record of Tropical Storm Edouard of the previous year, bringing substantial damage to the Caribbean and eastern North America. In the West Pacific, Tropical Storm Koguma formed near Hong Kong and crossed Hainan before making landfall in Vietnam. Champi formed later in the month, passing close to Guam and the Northern Mariana Islands before recurving out to sea and then intensifying into a typhoon. In the South Atlantic, Subtropical Storm Raoni formed off the coast of Uruguay, causing some impacts in Montevideo and Punta del Este.

Tropical cyclones formed in June 2021
Storm name	Dates active	Max wind km/h (mph)	Pressure (hPa)	Areas affected	Damage (USD)	Deaths	Refs
Koguma	June 11 – 13	65 (40)	996	Hainan, Hong Kong, Vietnam	$12.9 million	1	
Carlos	June 12 – 16	85 (50)	1000	None	None	None	
Bill	June 14 – 16	95 (60)	998	North Carolina, Nova Scotia	None	None	
Dolores	June 18 – 20	110 (70)	989	Colima, Jalisco, Guerrero, Michoacán, Nayarit, Oaxaca, Sinaloa	$50 million	3	
Claudette	June 19 – 22	75 (45)	1004	Alabama, Florida, Georgia, Louisiana, Mississippi, North Carolina, Oaxaca, Veracruz	$375 million	14	
Champi	June 21 – 27	120 (75)	980	Guam, Northern Mariana Islands	None	None	
Enrique	June 25 – 30	150 (90)	975	Southwestern Mexico, Baja California Peninsula	$50 million	2	
Danny	June 28 – 29	75 (45)	1009	Bermuda, Georgia, South Carolina	Minimal	None	
Raoni	June 28 – July 1	95 (60)	986	Brazil, Uruguay	None	None	
TD	June 30	Unknown	1008	None	None	None	
Elsa	June 30 – July 9	140 (85)	991	Barbados, Trinidad and Tobago, Leeward Islands, Windward Islands, Venezuela, Hispaniola, Cuba, Jamaica, Cayman Islands, East Coast of the United States, Atlantic Canada	$1.2 billion	5	

=== July ===
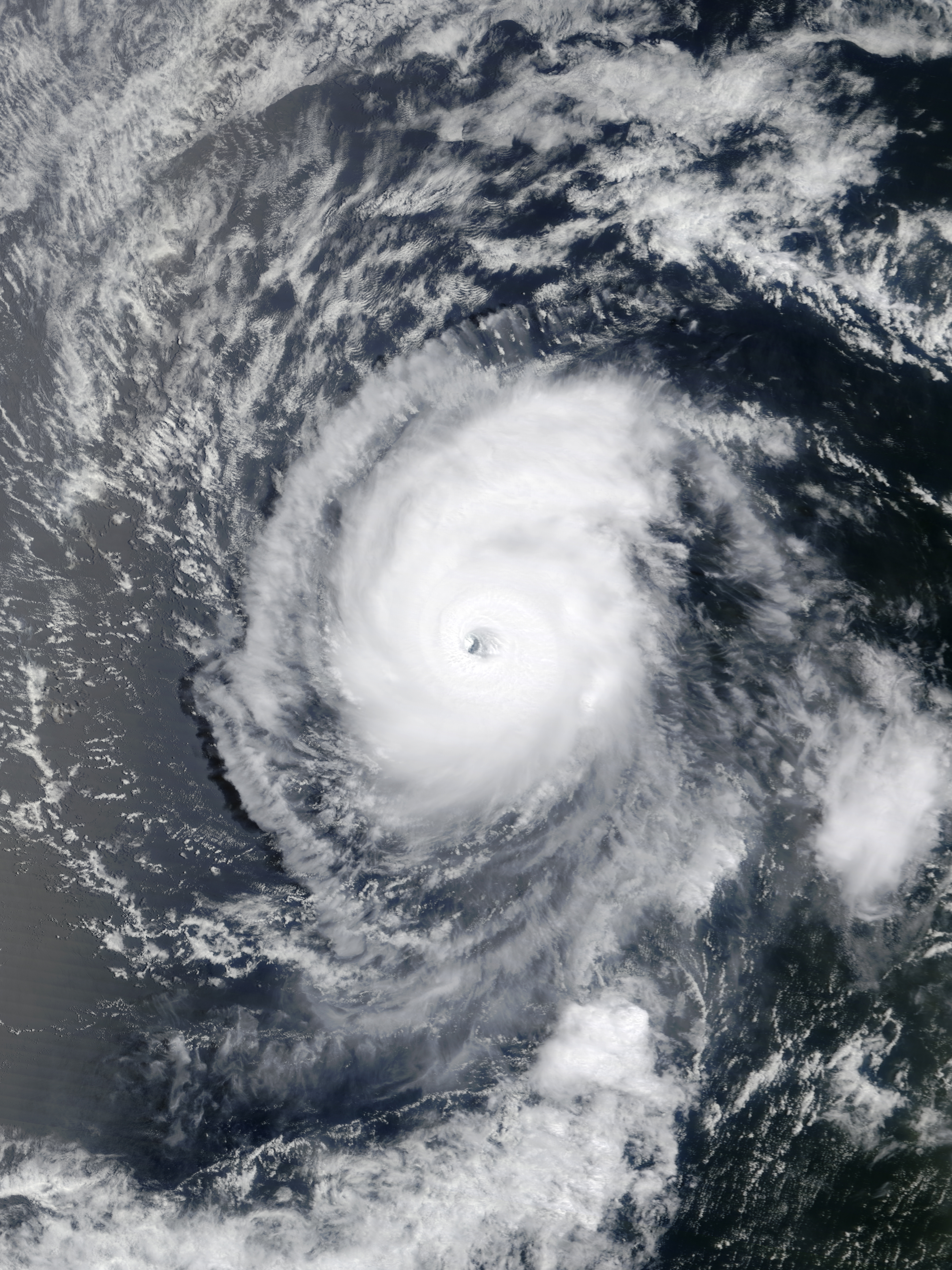
Hurricane Felicia

July was average, featuring fourteen tropical cyclones, with seven being named. In the East Pacific, Hurricane Felicia and Tropical Storm Guillermo formed in the middle half of the month, with Felicia becoming the first major hurricane of its respective Pacific hurricane season. Hurricane Hilda would then form at the end of the month. In the West Pacific, two tropical depressions formed and were designated as 07W and 08W respectively. The former received the name Emong from PAGASA. Further into the month, two typhoons named In-fa and Cempaka and Tropical Storm Nepartak formed, with In-fa making landfall in China as severe tropical storm while Cempaka made landfall in Southern China as a typhoon; both were associated with the 2021 Henan floods. Nepartak, on the other hand, made landfall on the Miyagi Prefecture in Japan. The storm disturbed the ongoing Summer Olympics held in the country.

Tropical cyclones formed in July 2021
Storm name	Dates active	Max wind km/h (mph)	Pressure (hPa)	Areas affected	Damage (USD)	Deaths	Refs
07W (Emong)	July 3 – 6	55 (35)	1004	Palau, Philippines	None	None	
08W	July 5 – 8	55 (35)	1000	Hainan, Hong Kong, Vietnam	None	None	
Felicia	July 14 – 21	230 (145)	947	None	None	None	
In-fa (Fabian)	July 16 – 29	150 (90)	950	Philippines, Ryukyu Islands, Taiwan, China	$2.04 billion	6	
Cempaka	July 17 – 25	130 (80)	980	South China, Vietnam	>$4.25 million	3	
Guillermo	July 17 – 20	95 (60)	999	None	None	None	
TD	July 19 – 20	Unknown	1012	None	None	None	
Nepartak	July 23 – 28	75 (45)	990	Japan	None	None	
TD	July 28 – 29	Unknown	1004	None	None	None	
TD	July 30 – August 1	Unknown	998	Japan	None	None	
Hilda	July 30 – August 6	140 (85)	985	None	None	None	
Jimena	July 30 – August 7	65 (40)	1005	None	None	None	
TD	July 31 – August 3	55 (35)	998	None	None	None	

=== August ===
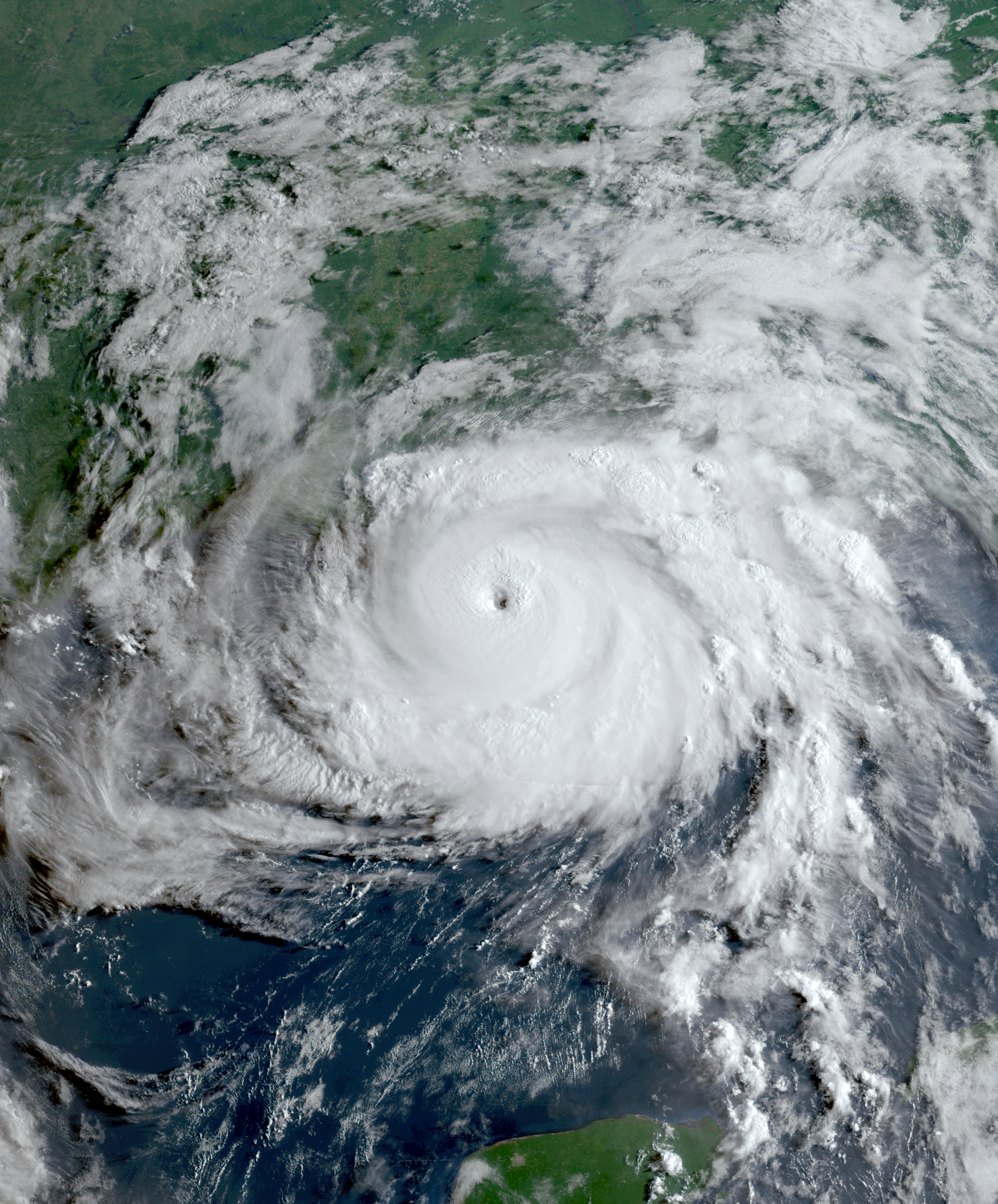
Hurricane Ida

August was fair-above average, featuring eighteen tropical cyclones, with sixteen of them being named. In the East Pacific, Tropical Storm Ignacio formed, but dissipated a few days later due to strong wind shear partially due to its proximity to Hurricane Hilda. Tropical Storm Kevin would then form a couple of days later, off the coast of Mexico with Hurricane Linda following shortly after, peaking as a low-end Category 4-equivalent hurricane. Linda was to be followed by Tropical Storm Marty and Hurricane Nora. In the West Pacific, tropical storms Lupit, Mirinae, Nida and Omais formed, with Lupit making landfall in China and Japan. In the North Atlantic, Tropical Storm Fred formed south of Puerto Rico and made landfall in the Florida Panhandle, with Hurricanes Grace and Henri forming later. Grace impacted the Caribbean before making landfall on the Yucatán Peninsula before rapidly intensifying in the Bay of Campeche and making landfall as a category 3 hurricane in mainland Mexico. Henri would impact the Northeastern United States as a tropical storm, becoming the first tropical cyclone to make landfall in Rhode Island since Hurricane Bob in 1991. At the end of the month, Hurricanes Ida and Larry, as well as tropical storms Julian and Kate, and formed. Ida, which became the strongest storm of the month, brought impacts to Cuba before striking Louisiana on August 29, notably on the 16th anniversary of Hurricane Katrina, tying with Hurricane Laura of the previous year and the 1856 Last Island Hurricane as the strongest hurricane to make landfall in the state by maximum winds.

Tropical cyclones formed in August 2021
Storm name	Dates active	Max wind km/h (mph)	Pressure (hPa)	Areas affected	Damage (USD)	Deaths	Refs
Ignacio	August 1 – 4	65 (40)	1004	Clarion Island	None	None	
TD	August 1 – 3	Unknown	996	Ryukyu Islands, Taiwan	None	None	
12W	August 2 – 6	55 (35)	1000	Japan	None	None	
Lupit (Huaning)	August 2 – 9	85 (50)	985	Vietnam, South China, Taiwan, Ryukyu Islands, Japan	$267 million	6	
Nida	August 3 – 8	95 (60)	992	None	None	None	
Mirinae (Gorio)	August 3 – 10	85 (50)	980	Ryukyu Islands, Japan	None	None	
Kevin	August 7 – 12	95 (60)	999	Revillagigedo Islands	None	None	
Linda	August 10 – 20	215 (130)	950	Revillagigedo Islands, Hawaii	Minimal	None	
Omais (Isang)	August 10 – 24	95 (60)	994	Marshall Islands, Micronesia, Mariana Islands, Ryukyu Islands, South Korea	$13 million	None	
Fred	August 11 – 18	100 (65)	991	Lesser Antilles, Puerto Rico, Hispaniola, Cuba, The Bahamas, Southeastern United States, Eastern Great Lakes Region, Northeastern United States, Southern Quebec, The Maritimes	$1.3 billion	7	
Falchion	August 12 – 16	55 (35)	1006	Black Sea	Unknown	None	
Grace	August 13 – 21	205 (125)	962	Lesser Antilles, Puerto Rico, Dominican Republic, Haiti, Cuba, Jamaica, Cayman Islands, Yucatán Peninsula, Mexico	$513 million	16	
Henri	August 16 – 23	120 (75)	986	Bermuda, Northeastern United States, Southern Nova Scotia	$700 million	2	
Marty	August 23 – 24	75 (45)	1000	None	None	None	
Nora	August 25 – 30	140 (85)	977	Mexico	$192 million	3	
Ida	August 26 – September 1	240 (150)	929	Leeward Islands, Venezuela, Colombia, Panama, Jamaica, Cayman Islands, Cuba, Southeastern United States, Northeastern United States, New England, Nova Scotia	$75.3 billion	112	
Kate	August 28 – September 1	75 (45)	1003	None	None	None	
Julian	August 29 – 30	95 (60)	995	None	None	None	
Larry	August 31 – September 11	205 (125)	955	Bermuda, Newfoundland and Labrador	$61 million	5	

=== September ===
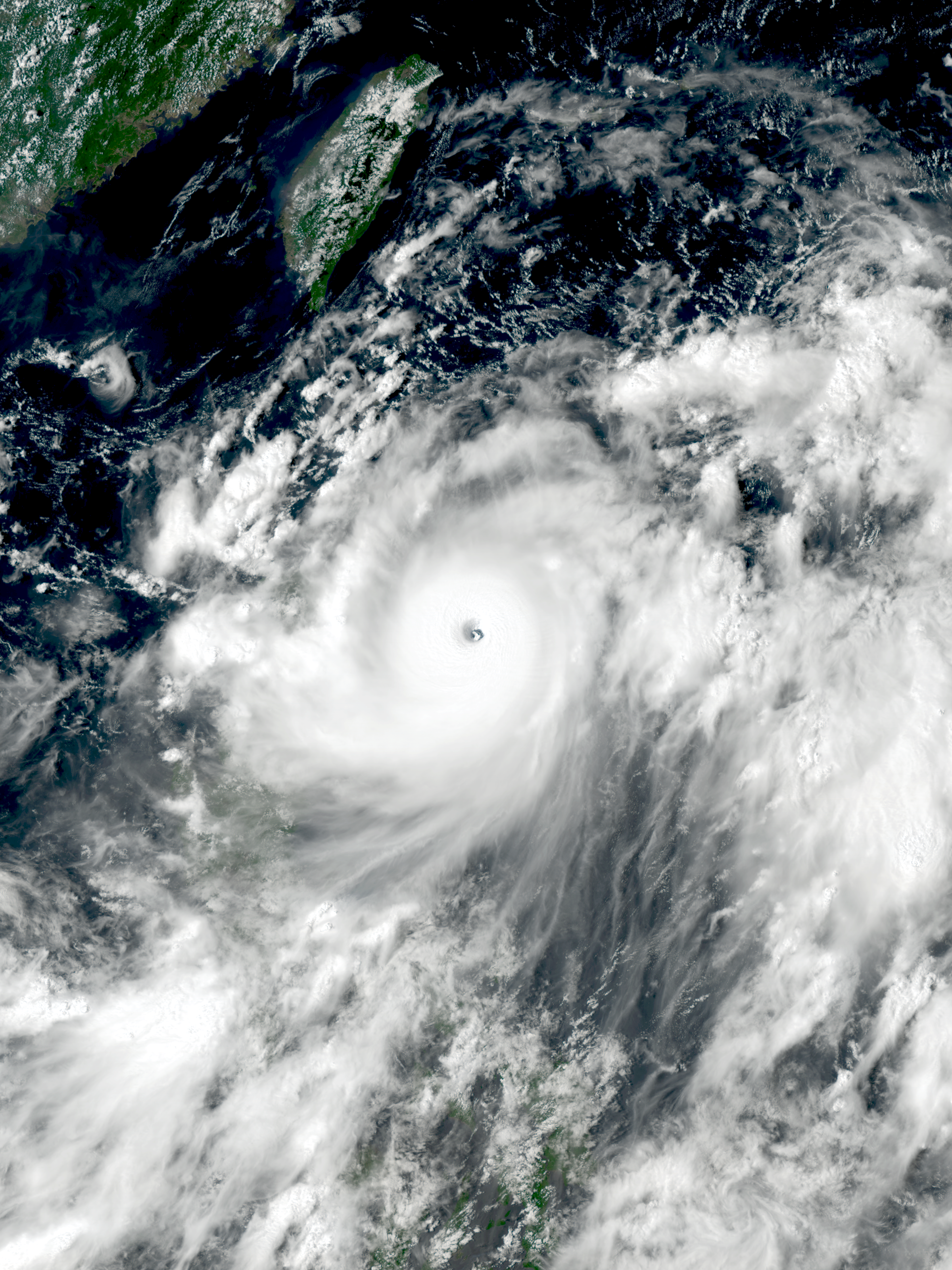
Typhoon Chanthu

September was well–above average, featuring nineteen storms, with fifteen of them being named. In the East Pacific, Hurricane Olaf being the only system in the basin, formed on the east coast of Mexico and later made landfall on the Baja California Peninsula as a Category 2 hurricane. In the West Pacific, Tropical Storms Conson and Dianmu, Typhoons Chanthu and Mindulle as well as three short-lived depressions formed, with Chanthu becoming the strongest storm of the month. Conson made a series of landfalls in the Philippines while Chanthu affected most of East Asia, due to the system stalling in the East China Sea. Mindulle on the other hand caused minor damage on Japan's Izu Islands. In the Atlantic, (Sub)Tropical Storms Mindy, Odette, Peter, Rose, Teresa, Victor as well as Hurricanes Nicholas and Sam formed. Mindy made landfall on St. Vincent Island in Florida, while Nicholas made landfall near Sargent in Texas. Hurricane Sam was a slow moving Category 4 hurricane which traveled across the Atlantic for two weeks. In the North Indian Ocean, Cyclonic Storm Gulab, Shaheen (a regeneration of Gulab), and BOB 03 formed. Gulab made landfall in India, causing minor damage. Soon, the remnants of Gulab regenerated into Shaheen in the Arabian Sea west of India. Shaheen entered the Gulf of Oman and eventually made landfall near Al Suwaiq in the governorate of Al Batinah North in Oman. Shaheen became the first cyclone to hit the country since Cyclone Hikaa in 2019 and was the first cyclone to hit the area since 1890. It was also the first cyclone to enter the Gulf of Oman since Cyclone Gonu in 2007.

Tropical cyclones formed in September 2021
Storm name	Dates active	Max wind km/h (mph)	Pressure (hPa)	Areas affected	Damage (USD)	Deaths	Refs
17W	September 1 – 4	55 (35)	1008	None	None	None	
Conson (Jolina)	September 5 – 13	100 (65)	985	Philippines, Vietnam, Hainan	$107 million	26	
Chanthu (Kiko)	September 5 – 18	215 (130)	905	Philippines, Taiwan, Ryukyu Islands, South Korea, Japan	>$30 million	None	
TD	September 7 – 8	Unknown	1004	Vietnam	None	None	
Olaf	September 7 – 11	155 (100)	968	Baja California Sur	$18.8 million	1	
Mindy	September 8 – 9	60 (95)	1000	Gulf Coast of the United States	$75.2 million	23	
BOB 03	September 12 – 15	55 (35)	990	Odisha	Unknown	None	
Nicholas	September 12 – 16	120 (75)	988	Mexico, Gulf Coast of the United States	$1.1 billion	4	
Odette	September 17 – 18	75 (45)	1002	East Coast of the United States, Atlantic Canada	None	None	
Peter	September 19 – 23	85 (50)	1004	Hispaniola, Leeward Islands, Puerto Rico	None	None	
Rose	September 19 – 23	95 (60)	1004	None	None	None	
Mindulle	September 22 – October 2	195 (120)	920	Mariana Islands, Japan	None	None	
Dianmu	September 22 – 24	65 (40)	1000	Vietnam, Laos, Cambodia	None	None	
Sam	September 22 – October 5	250 (155)	927	Bermuda	None	None	
Gulab	September 24 – 28	85 (50)	992	India	$271 million	20	
Teresa	September 24 – 25	75 (45)	1008	Bermuda	None	None	
TD	September 27 – October 2	Unknown	1004	None	None	None	
Victor	September 29 – October 4	95 (60)	997	None	None	None	
Shaheen	September 30 – October 4	100 (75)	986	India, Pakistan, Iran, Oman, United Arab Emirates, Saudi Arabia, Yemen	$520 million	14	

=== October ===
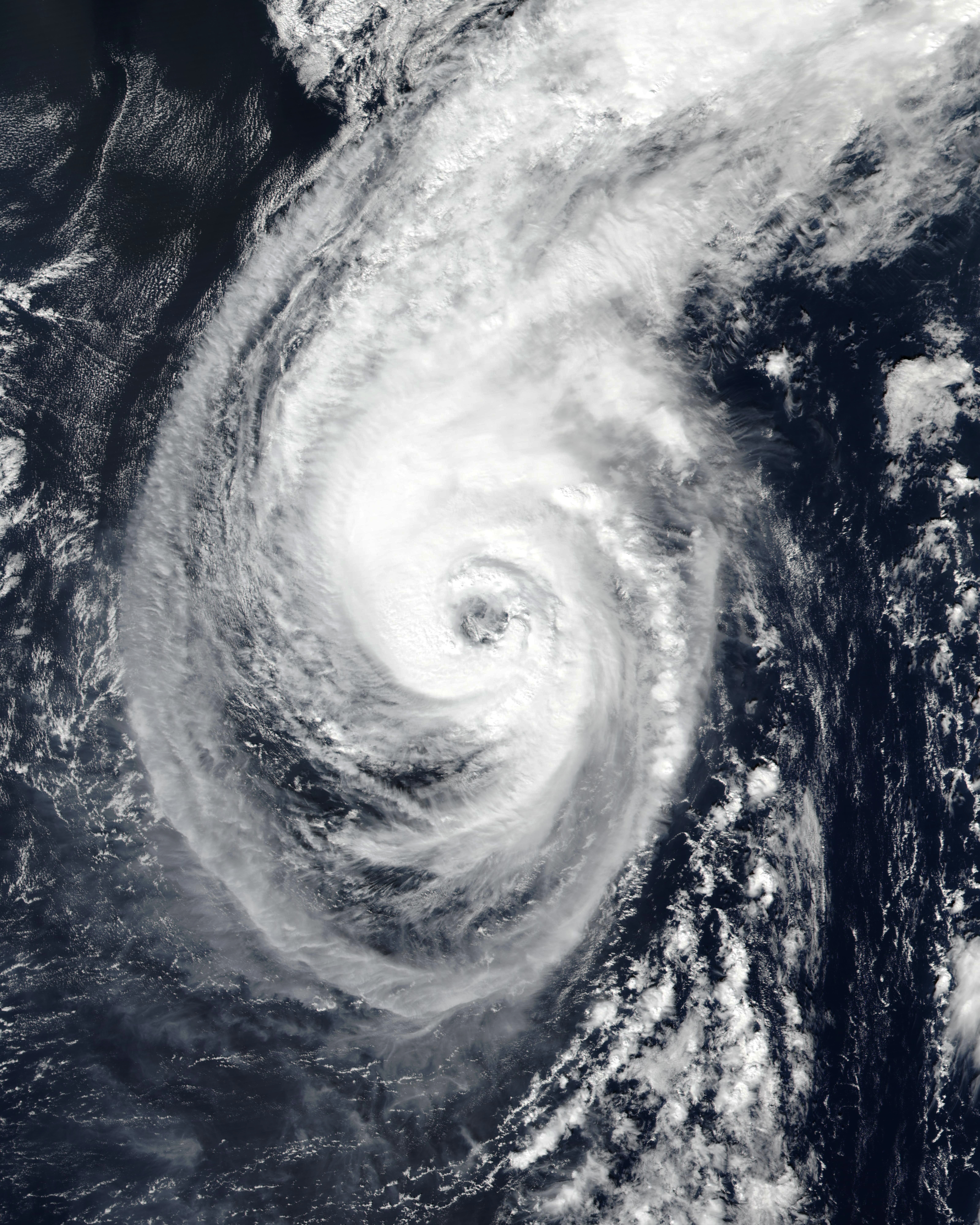
Typhoon Malou

October was unusually below-average, featuring only ten storms, with eight of them being named. (Note: Nando isn't included because it's named by the PAGASA not by the JMA.) The month also includes an unofficial cyclone named Apollo which formed in the Mediterranean Sea. In the East Pacific, two hurricanes named Pamela and Rick formed with both of them impacting Mexico. Pamela formed on the southern coast of Zihuatanejo where it made landfall in Sinaloa and then rapidly weakened to a tropical depression. Almost a week after Pamela dissipated, Rick formed south of Mexico and made landfall on the country as a Category 2 hurricane. In the West Pacific, Typhoon Malou, Tropical storms Lionrock, Kompasu, Namtheun, and along with two tropical depressions formed. One of the depressions was named Nando by the PAGASA. Nando formed east of another developing tropical depression, where it then merged with the depression and contributed to the formation of Kompasu. Lionrock struck Hong Kong, Southern China and Vietnam. Kompasu also affected the same area where Lionrock struck a week prior, causing severe loss of life and damage. The Atlantic was unusually quiet, only featuring a tropical storm named Wanda. Wanda developed from a strong late October nor'easter that had previously affected much of the Northeastern United States. The naming of Wanda made the 2021 Atlantic hurricane season the second season in a row after the previous year to run out of names on the standard naming list.

Tropical cyclones formed in October 2021
Storm name	Dates active	Max wind km/h (mph)	Pressure (hPa)	Areas affected	Damage (USD)	Deaths	Refs
Lionrock (Lannie)	October 5 – 10	65 (40)	994	Philippines, China, Vietnam	$74.9 million	8	
Kompasu (Maring)	October 7 – 14	100 (65)	975	Philippines, China, Taiwan, Vietnam	$545 million	46	
Nando	October 7 – 8	Unknown	1002	Philippines	None	None	
Namtheun	October 8 – 16	95 (60)	996	Wake Island	None	None	
Pamela	October 10 – 14	130 (80)	985	Socorro Island, Baja California Sur, Mexico, Southeastern United States	$94.4 million	3	
Rick	October 22 – 26	165 (105)	977	Central America, Northwestern Mexico, Western Mexico, Southeastern United States	$25.8 million	1	
Malou	October 23 – 29	140 (85)	965	Bonin Islands	None	None	
26W	October 24 – 27	Unknown	1006	Philippines, Vietnam	Unknown	None	
Apollo	October 25 – November 2	100 (65)	999	Italy (Especially Sicily), Malta, Tunisia, Algeria, Libya, Turkey	$245 million	7	
Wanda	October 31 – November 7	95 (60)	983	Southern United States, Mid-Atlantic United States, Northeastern United States, Atlantic Canada, Bermuda, (Note: The October 2021 nor'easter (predecessor of Wanda) affected these areas.) Azores	>$200 million (Note: The October 2021 nor'easter (predecessor of Wanda) caused the damage.)	2 (Note: The October 2021 nor'easter (predecessor of Wanda) caused the fatalities.)	

=== November ===
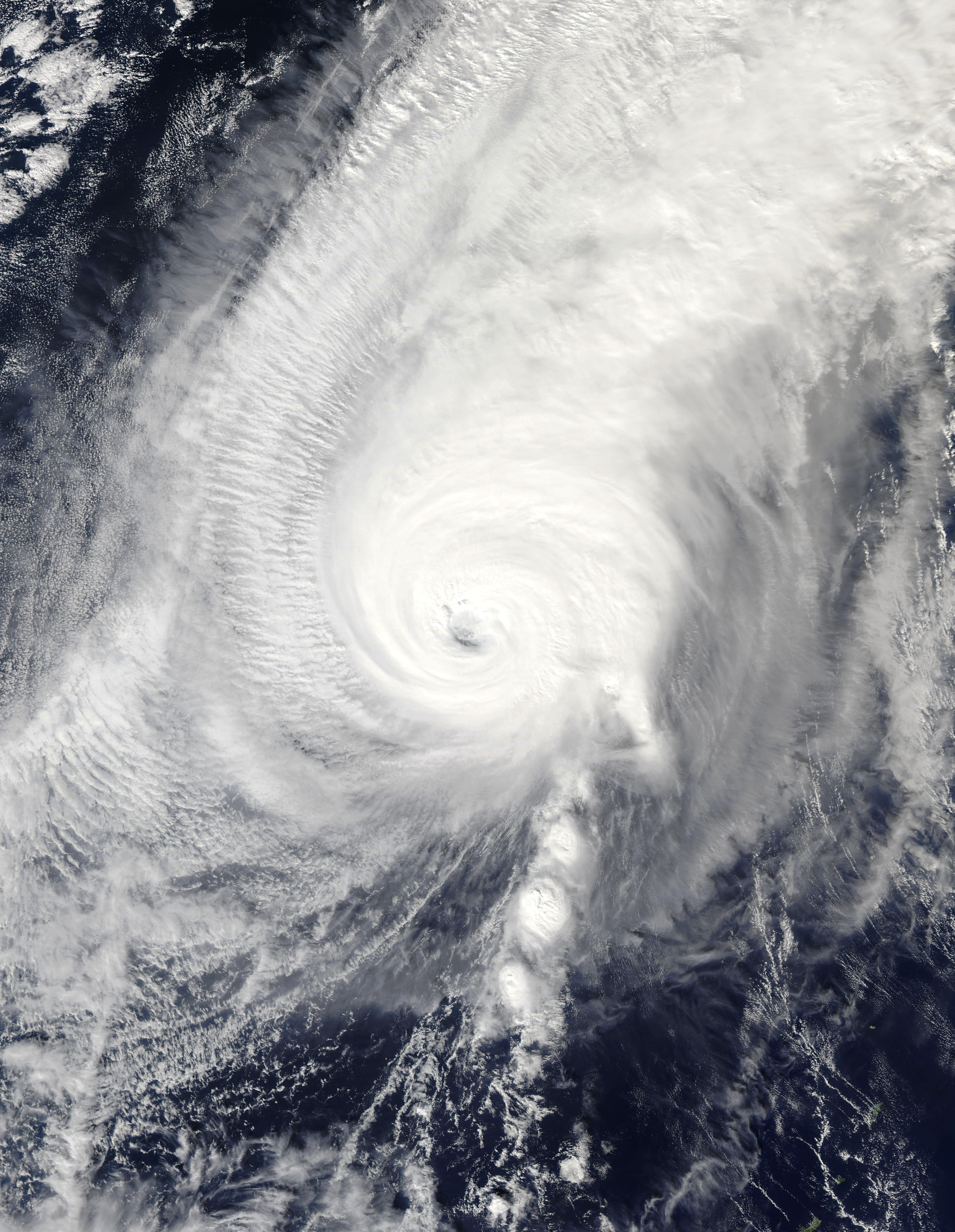
Typhoon Nyatoh

November was an average month in terms of activity, featuring eleven storms, of which six were named. The month also includes another unofficial cyclone named Blas which formed in the Mediterranean Sea near Spain. In the East Pacific, Tropical Storms Terry and Sandra formed, with both of the storms being named simultaneously on November 7. The West Pacific only featured a super typhoon named Nyatoh which developed near Guam, ending the record-long streak without a major tropical cyclone worldwide since October 3. Nyatoh became the strongest cyclone of November, later crossing into December and dissipating. In the North Indian Ocean, three depressions classified as ARB 03, BOB 05 and BOB 06 formed. BOB 05 caused severe flooding in Southern India and Sri Lanka which killed more than 40 people, with BOB 06 causing additional damages over the same places; the worst damages occurred in the Rayalaseema region of Andhra Pradesh. Additionally, a tropical low formed in the Southern Hemisphere which began the 2021–22 Australian region cyclone season. Later, another low formed which was then named Paddy. Following Paddy, a few more depressions formed but dissipated a few days later. At the end of the month, Tropical Cyclone Teratai formed south of Java but struggled to develop due to the lack of outflow. It then re-strengthened back into a tropical storm before weakening again and dissipating.

Tropical cyclones formed in November 2021
Storm name	Dates active	Max wind km/h (mph)	Pressure (hPa)	Areas affected	Damage (USD)	Deaths	Refs
Terry	November 4 – 10	75 (45)	1004	None	None	None	
ARB 03	November 7 – 9	45 (30)	1002	None	None	None	
Sandra	November 7 – 9	65 (40)	1005	None	None	None	
TL	November 9 – 14	Unknown	1005	None	None	None	
BOB 05	November 10 – 12	45 (30)	1000	India, Sri Lanka	Unknown	41	
Blas	November 11 – 15	65 (40)	1007	Algeria, East coast of Spain, Balearic Islands, Morocco, Sardinia, France, Sicily, Italy	$1 million	9	
Paddy	November 17 – 23	75 (45)	992	Christmas Island	None	None	
BOB 06	November 18 – 19	45 (30)	1002	India	None	None	
03U	November 22 – 28	Unknown	1006	None	None	None	
Nyatoh	November 28 – December 3	185 (115)	925	Bonin Islands	None	None	
Teratai	November 30 – December 11	65 (40)	998	Christmas Island	None	None	

=== December ===
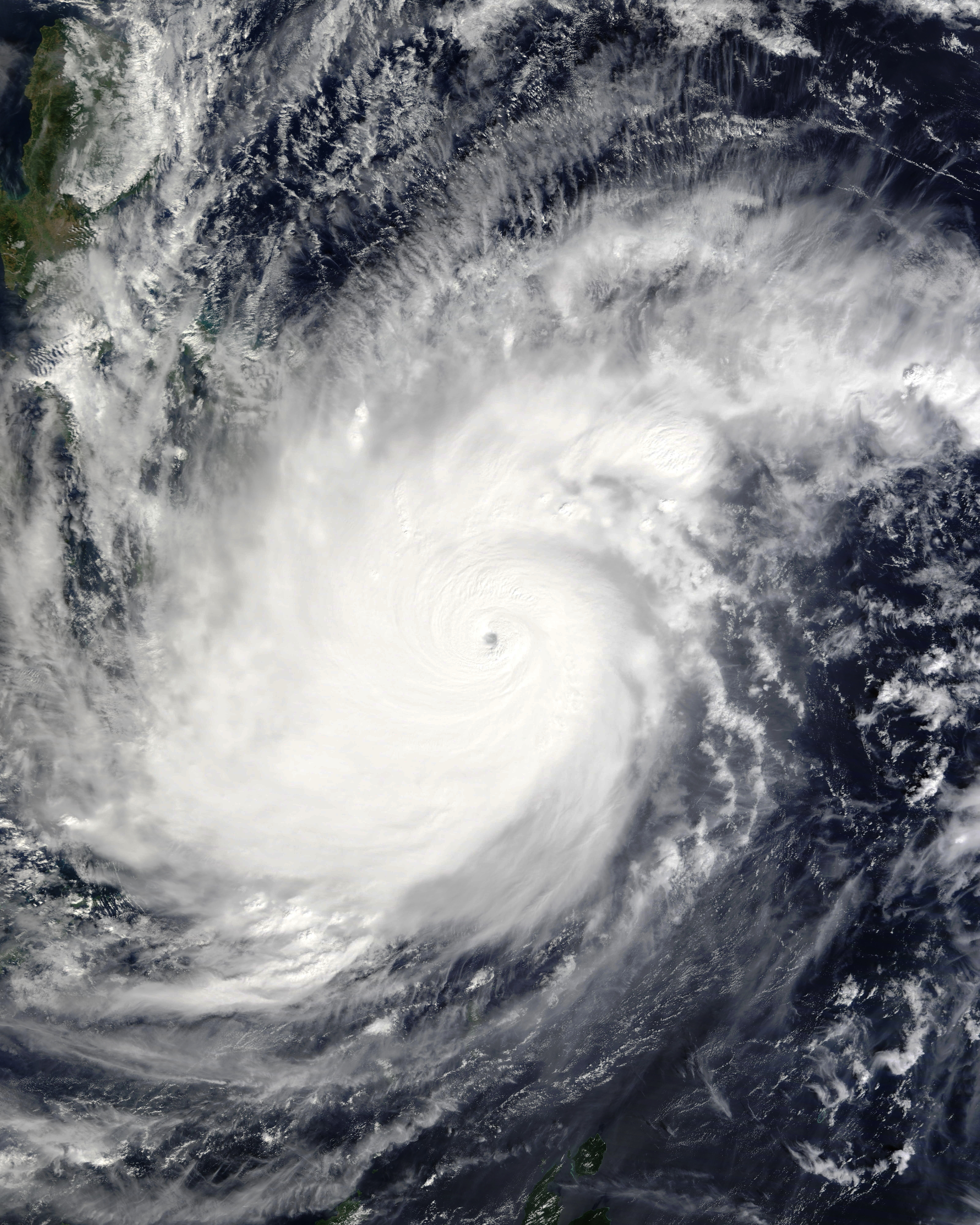
Typhoon Rai

December was slightly inactive, featuring nine storms, with five of them being named. The month started off with the formation of Cyclone Jawad which formed in the North Indian Ocean. However, Jawad rapidly weakened due to wind shear shortly after being named, and degenerated into a low-pressure area before it could make landfall over West Bengal. The Western Pacific featured a tropical depression classified as 29W and a deadly and destructive typhoon, Typhoon Rai. Rai formed east of Palau before rapidly intensifying into a Category 5 super typhoon. It then made multiple landfalls on the Philippines causing serious damage. Rai then entered the South China Sea, re-strengthening into a Category 5 super typhoon east of Vietnam before dissipating near Hong Kong. Rai became the first Category 5 super typhoon since Nock-ten to form in the month on December. It was also the third Category 5 super typhoon recorded in the South China Sea, behind Pamela in 1954 and Rammasun in 2014. On the other hand, 29W formed near the equator before making landfall on Peninsular Malaysia, flooding some states within Malaysia. The Southern Hemisphere was inactive, only featuring three tropical lows and two cyclones named Ruby and Seth. Ruby intensified into a Category 2 tropical cyclone on the Australian scale and entered the South Pacific basin, making it the first storm in the basin. Ruby then made landfall on the French overseas island of New Caledonia. Seth, on the other hand, first originated in the Arafura Sea. It then wandered around the northern regions of Australia before being named in the Solomon Sea. The Southern Atlantic featured its third named storm of the year, Subtropical Storm Ubá.

Tropical cyclones formed in December 2021
Storm name	Dates active	Max wind km/h (mph)	Pressure (hPa)	Areas affected	Damage (USD)	Deaths	Refs
Jawad	December 2 – 6	75 (45)	999	Andaman Islands, Odisha, Andhra Pradesh, West Bengal, Bangladesh	$50.4 million	2	
Ubá	December 10 – 13	65 (40)	995	Argentina, Brazil, Uruguay	Unknown	15	
Ruby	December 10 – 14	110 (70)	975	Solomon Islands, New Caledonia	None	None	
Rai (Odette)	December 11 – 21	195 (120)	915	Caroline Islands, Palau, Philippines, Spratly Islands, Vietnam, Hainan Island, South China, Hong Kong, Macau	$968 million	410	
06U	December 13 – 15	Unknown	1007	None	None	None	
29W	December 14 – 17	Unknown	1006	Malaysia	$70 million	54	
02F	December 17 – 20	Unknown	1006	None	None	None	
Seth	December 24, 2021 – January 6, 2022	110 (70)	983	Australia	>$80 million	2	
TL	December 26, 2021 – January 3, 2022	Unknown	Unknown	None	None	None	

== Global effects ==
There are a total of nine tropical cyclone basins, seven are seasonal and two are non-seasonal, thus all seven basins except the Mediterranean and South Atlantic are active. In this table, data from all these basins are added. Deaths in parentheses are additional and indirect (an example of an indirect death would be a traffic accident).

Season name		Areas affected	Systems formed	Named storms	Hurricane-force tropical cyclones	Damage (2021 USD)	Deaths	Ref.
North Atlantic Ocean (Note: The wind speeds for this tropical cyclone/basin are based on the Saffir Simpson Scale which uses 1-minute sustained winds.)		Atlantic Canada, Cayman Islands, Colombia, Cuba, The Bahamas, Bermuda, East Coast of the United States, Eastern United States, Gulf Coast of the United States, Midwestern United States, Northeastern United States, Southeastern United States, Jamaica, Venezuela, Mexico, Oaxaca, Central America, Lesser Antilles, Hispaniola, Yucatán Peninsula, Puerto Rico, West Africa, Iceland, Greenland	21	21	7	$80.83 billion	108 (90)	
Eastern and Central Pacific Ocean		Mexico, Central America, Costa Rica, Baja California Peninsula, Colima, Michoacán, State of Mexico, Hawaii, Revillagigedo Islands	19	19	8	$431 million	13	
Western Pacific Ocean (Note: Only systems that formed either before or on December 31, 2020 are counted in the seasonal totals.)		China, Hong Kong, Macau, Indochina, Japan, Korean Peninsula, Malaysia, Palau, Philippines, Russian Far East, Sulawesi, Taiwan, Caroline Islands, Marshall Islands, Mariana Islands, Guam, Yap State, Alaska, Aleutian Islands	41	22	10	$4.13 billion	579	
North Indian Ocean (Note: The wind speeds for this tropical cyclone/basin are based on the IMD Scale which uses 3-minute sustained winds.)		India, Andhra Pradesh, Andaman and Nicobar Islands, Dadra and Nagar Haveli and Daman and Diu, Goa, Gujarat, Karnataka, Kerala, Maharashtra, Odisha, Sindh, West Bengal, Uttar Pradesh, Bangladesh, Iran, Maldives, Myanmar, Nepal, Oman, Pakistan, Saudi Arabia, Sri Lanka, United Arab Emirates, Yemen	10	5	3	$6.09 billion	274	
South-West Indian Ocean	January – June (Note: Only systems that formed either on or after January 1, 2021 are counted in the seasonal totals.) (Note: The wind speeds for this tropical cyclone are based on Météo-France, which uses wind gusts.)	Eswatini, Madagascar, Malawi, Mozambique, Réunion, Seychelles, South Africa, Tanzania, Zimbabwe	8	7	4	$90.1 million	49	
South-West Indian Ocean	July – December	—N/a	—N/a	—N/a	—N/a	—N/a	—N/a	
Australian region	January – June	Christmas Islands, Cocos Islands, East Nusa Tenggara, East Timor, Far North Queensland, Northern Territory, Queensland, Western Australia, West Nusa Tenggara	14	8	3	$751 million	273	
Australian region	July – December	Christmas Islands, Solomon Islands, New Caledonia	8	4	1	$80 million	4	
South Pacific Ocean	January – June	Fiji, Niue, Solomon Islands, Samoan Islands, Tonga, Tuvalu, Vanuatu, Tokelau, Niue, Cook Islands, Wallis and Futuna, Norfolk Island	8	4	1	—N/a	1	
South Pacific Ocean	July – December	—N/a	1	—N/a	—N/a	—N/a	—N/a	
South Atlantic Ocean		Argentina, Uruguay, Brazil, Rio de Janeiro, Rio Grande do Sul	5	4	—N/a	Unknown	15	
Mediterranean Sea		Algeria, Italy, Libya, Malta, Spain, Tunisia, Turkey	3	2	—N/a	$245 million	16	
Worldwide		(Note: The sum of the number of systems in each basin will not equal the number shown as the total. This is because when systems move between basins, it creates a discrepancy in the actual number of systems.)	138	96	38	$92.644 billion	1,331 (90)	

== See also ==
- Weather of 2021
- Tropical cyclones by year
- List of earthquakes in 2021
- Tornadoes in 2021

== Notes ==
^{2} Only systems that formed either on or after January 1, 2021 are counted in the seasonal totals.
^{3} Only systems that formed either before or on December 31, 2021 are counted in the seasonal totals.
^{4} The wind speeds for this tropical cyclone/basin are based on the IMD Scale which uses 3-minute sustained winds.
^{5} The wind speeds for this tropical cyclone/basin are based on the Saffir Simpson Scale which uses 1-minute sustained winds.
^{6}The wind speeds for this tropical cyclone are based on Météo-France which uses wind gusts.
