= 2020 hurricane season =

The 2020 hurricane season may refer to:

- 2020 Atlantic hurricane season
- 2020 Pacific hurricane season
- 2020 Pacific typhoon season
- 2019–20 South-West Indian Ocean cyclone season
- 2019–20 Australian region cyclone season
- 2019–20 South Pacific cyclone season
- 2020 North Indian Ocean cyclone season
- 2020–21 South-West Indian Ocean cyclone season
- 2020–21 Australian region cyclone season
- 2020–21 South Pacific cyclone season
