= Cyclone Niran =

Category 5 Australian region and South Pacific cyclone in 2021

Severe Tropical Cyclone Niran
- Niran approaching New Caledonia at peak intensity on 5 March

Meteorological history
- Formed: 27 February 2021
- Extratropical: 6 March 2021
- Dissipated: 8 March 2021

Category 5 severe tropical cyclone
- 10-minute sustained (BOM)
- Highest winds: 205 km/h (125 mph)
- Highest gusts: 285 km/h (180 mph)
- Lowest pressure: 931 hPa (mbar); 27.49 inHg

Category 5-equivalent tropical cyclone
- 1-minute sustained (SSHWS/JTWC)
- Highest winds: 260 km/h (160 mph)
- Lowest pressure: 917 hPa (mbar); 27.08 inHg

Overall effects
- Fatalities: None
- Damage: $250 million (2021 USD)
- Areas affected: Queensland, New Caledonia, Vanuatu
- IBTrACS
- Part of the 2020–21 Australian region and South Pacific cyclone seasons

Severe Tropical Cyclone Niran was a very powerful tropical cyclone that brought severe impacts to extreme Northeastern Australia and nearly made landfall in New Caledonia in February and March 2021. The sixth tropical cyclone and the second severe tropical cyclone of the 2020–21 Australian region cyclone season, while being the third severe tropical cyclone of the annual South Pacific cyclone season, Niran was the second Category 5 severe tropical cyclone in the South Pacific cyclone season, following Cyclone Yasa. The cyclone formed from a tropical low in the Coral Sea on 27 February. The tropical low gradually intensified while stalling offshore of Queensland for several days, although disorganized at the time. Early on 3 March, Niran pulled away from the coast of Australia, while it started undergoing rapid intensification. Eventually, Niran reached its peak intensity as a Category 5 tropical cyclone on both the Australian Tropical Cyclone Scale and the Saffir–Simpson scale, on 5 March, well offshore of Australia. Soon afterward, Niran initiated an eyewall replacement cycle and encountered some wind shear, causing the storm to weaken on 6 March, as it passed just to the south of Grande Terre, the main island of New Caledonia. Afterwards, Niran continued rapidly weakening as wind shear increased further, before transitioning into an extratropical cyclone late on 6 March. Niran was absorbed into another extratropical storm two days later.

Before its strengthening phase, Niran significantly affected the banana crop in far-north Queensland. Several farms abroad were damaged, and some farmers lost 100% of their banana crop. Prices for the fruit were expected to rise. Estimates placed damage to the crop was A$200 million (US$154 million). Other infrastructure damage was minor. In New Caledonia, many houses had their roofs and infrastructure damaged, and nearly 70,000 people lost power in total. Multiple roads became impassable. Two people in New Caledonia were injured, though no one was killed. Total economic losses reached $250 million (2021 USD).

== Meteorological history ==
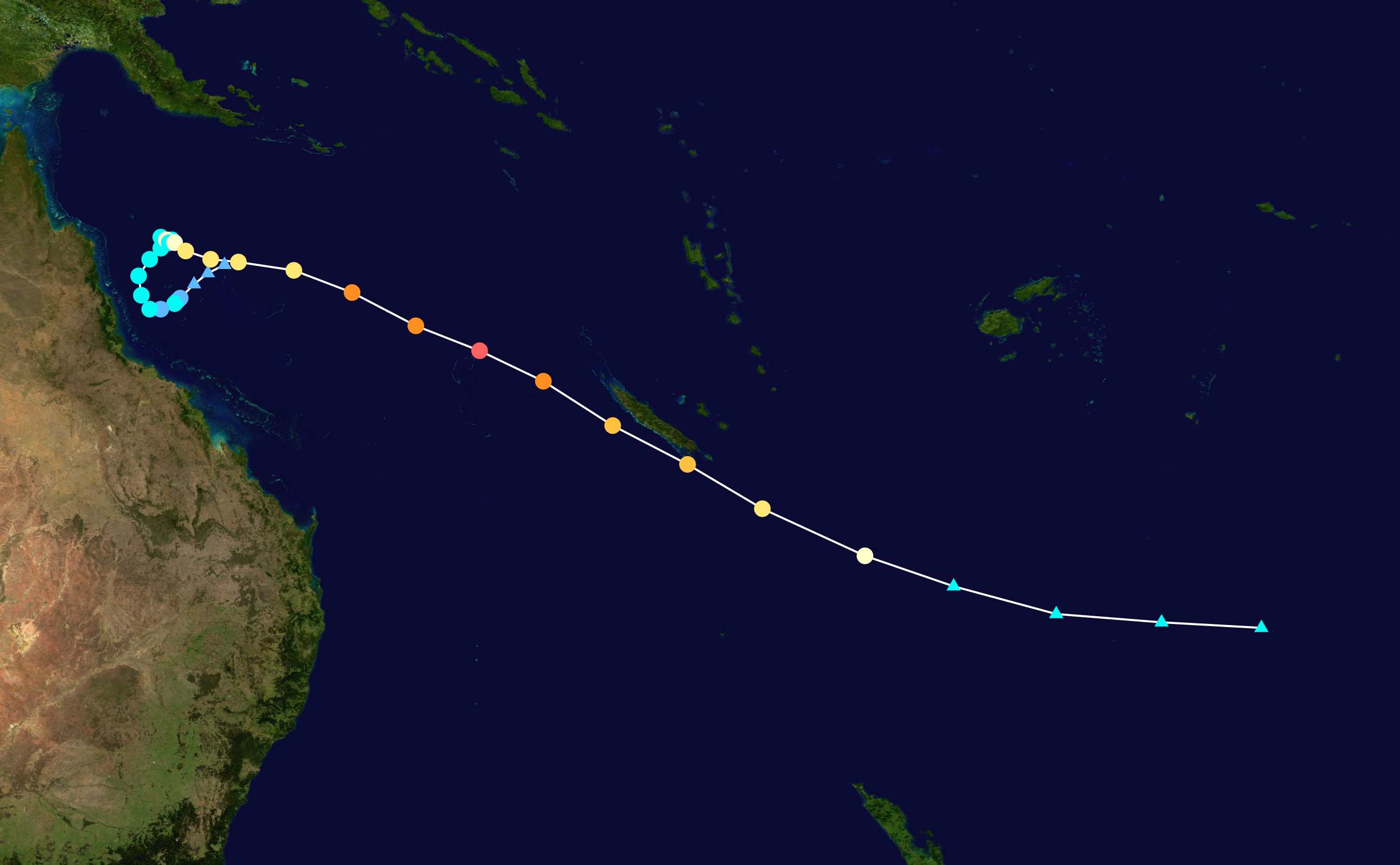
Map plotting the storm's track and intensity, according to the Saffir–Simpson scale Map key Saffir–Simpson scale Tropical depression (≤38 mph, ≤62 km/h) Tropical storm (39–73 mph, 63–118 km/h) Category 1 (74–95 mph, 119–153 km/h) Category 2 (96–110 mph, 154–177 km/h) Category 3 (111–129 mph, 178–208 km/h) Category 4 (130–156 mph, 209–251 km/h) Category 5 (≥157 mph, ≥252 km/h) Unknown Storm type Tropical cyclone Subtropical cyclone Extratropical cyclone, remnant low, tropical disturbance, or monsoon depression

During 27 February, the Bureau of Meteorology (BOM) began to monitor a developing tropical low off the coast of northern Queensland. The low began to strengthen while remaining offshore of the state, within an area favorable for tropical cyclogenesis. On 1 March, the tropical low was upgraded into a tropical cyclone by the BOM, and was given the name Niran. Later that same day, the strengthening cyclone reached Category 2 tropical cyclone status on the Australian scale. Niran began to pull away from the coast of Australia and underwent rapid intensification, reaching Category 3 severe tropical cyclone status on the Australian scale late on 3 March, and then reaching Category 4 severe tropical cyclone status on the Australian scale late on 4 March. Eventually, Niran intensified into a powerful Category 5 tropical cyclone on both the Australian region and the Saffir–Simpson hurricane wind scale (SSHWS), at 12:00 UTC on 5 March, displaying a well-defined pinhole eye.

Shortly afterward, the storm crossed into the Fiji Meteorological Service (FMS)'s area of responsibility, even as it accelerated southeastward towards New Caledonia. Around that time, Niran reached its peak intensity, attaining maximum 10-minute sustained winds of 205 km/h (125 mph), maximum 1-minute sustained winds of 260 km/h (160 mph), and a central minimum pressure of 931 millibars (27.5 inHg). However, several hours later, Niran began an eyewall replacement cycle and encountered wind shear, causing the storm to begin yet another significant weakening trend, with the storm falling down back to Category 4 status on the SSHWS. At 12:00 UTC on 6 March, Niran made its closest approach to New Caledonia's main island of Grande Terre, as a Category 3-equivalent tropical cyclone, as the eye of the storm passed just south of the island's southeastern flank. As wind shear continued to substantially increase over the storm, it weakened to a Category 3 severe tropical cyclone on the Australian scale and a Category 2 tropical cyclone on the SSHWS, later that day, as it began undergoing extratropical transition. Late that day, Niran had completed its extratropical transition as it continued accelerating towards the southeast. Niran continued moving southeastward for another couple of days, before being absorbed into a larger extratropical cyclone to the south on 8 March.

== Preparation and impacts ==
=== Australia ===
==== Queensland ====
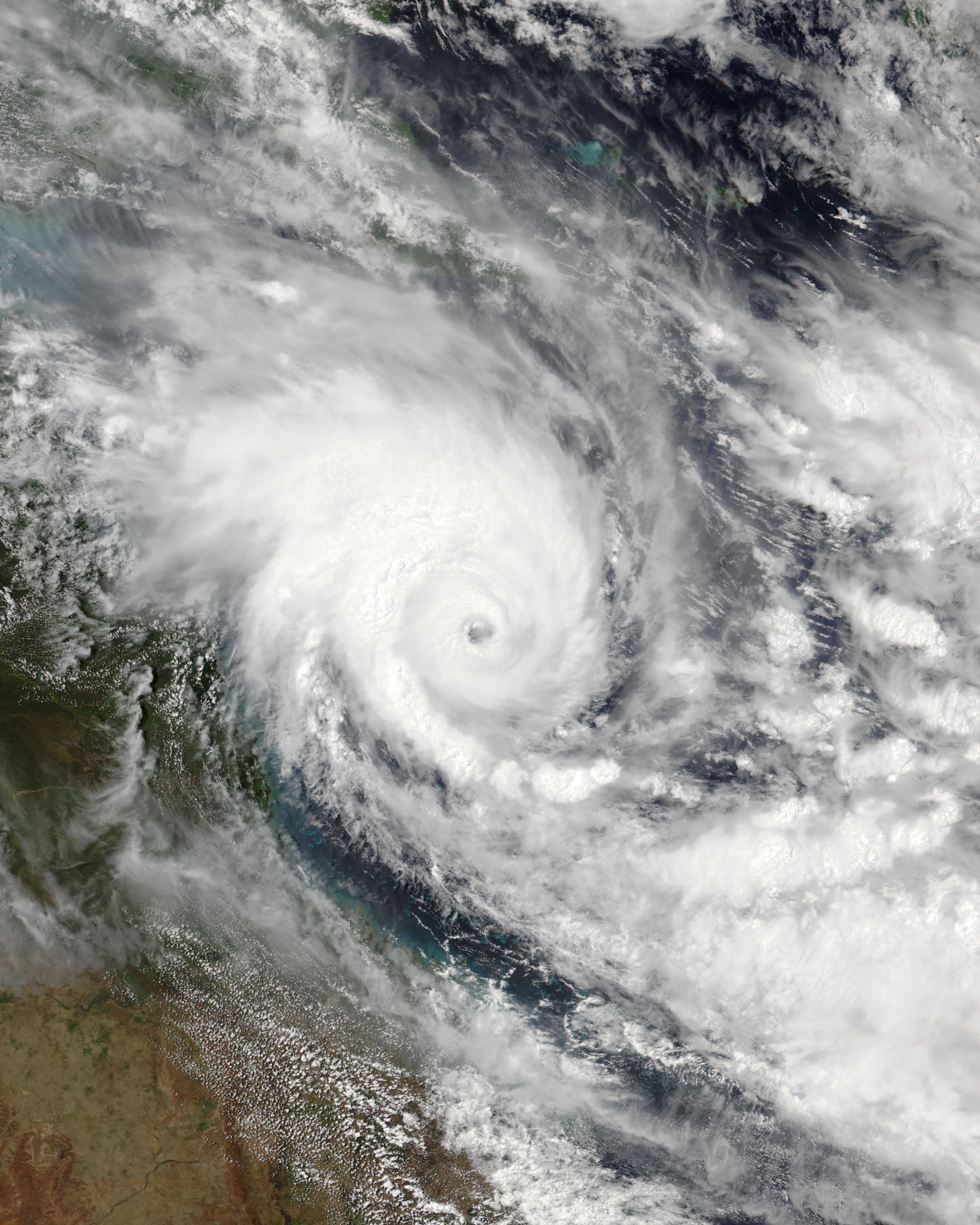
Severe Tropical Cyclone Niran off the coast of Queensland on 4 March

A warning was put in place for the coast of Northern Queensland; however, the warning was dropped as Niran moved eastward and away from the coast. A gale warning was issued on 2 March for coastal and island communities, Cape Flattery and Innisfail, though it was cancelled when Niran moved away.

In the far-north region of the state, some banana crops were wiped out by Niran in its early phase. Some farmers said they had lost nearly 100% of their banana crops. In total, over 42,000 people lost power from the storm, due to high winds. State emergency teams were sent to attend to downed poles and damaged homes, and they reported minor structural damage in the Cairns region. The Australian Banana Growers’ Council said on 2 March that it was too early to estimate damage, but stated it would be significant. In the Cassowary Coast Region, farmers were expected to be without income until September or October. Two people were rescued from floodwaters.

Crop damage related to Niran was A$200 million (US$154 million). There were fears that the prices for bananas would increase drastically again, as had occurred after Cyclone Larry in 2006 and Cyclone Yasi in 2011. They were expected to increase by 50 cents to $1 a kilo after Niran. Damage to farm infrastructure was labeled "catastrophic" and "severe" by locals. In production nurseries, shade houses and tree crops were damaged. Stephen Lowe, the council chief executive of the Australian Banana Growers’ Council, estimated about 5,000 hectares of crops were affected, and 150 farms were damaged; however, over 11,000 hectares (27,000 acres) may have been damaged, and clean-up could take upwards of a year. Niran was estimated to have destroyed around one-third of Australia's banana crops. The highest recorded total for rainfall was in Clump Point, which saw 276 mm (10.9 in) of rain in 24 hours.

=== New Caledonia ===
As the storm approached, New Caledonia was placed on high alert, as Niran was expected to cause severe damage in the country, especially on the main island of Grande Terre. Authorities placed the entire island nation under a Level Two Tropical Cyclone Alert late on 5 March as the storm bore down on the country. Air Calédonie moved their entire fleet of airplanes to Brisbane, Australia, in order to protect them from the storm. Waves as high as 13 metres (43 ft) were also expected for the western side of New Caledonia.

Niran caused extensive damage in New Caledonia during its close passage. 39,000 households lost electricity in urban areas while roads quickly became impassable. Winds of up to 150 km/h (95 mph) affected portions of the country in its passage, despite the strongest portion of the storm missing the coastline. Two people were injured, including a child which was hit by shards of glass from a bay window. In the capital city of Nouméa, several ships were forced aground on the coast. 400 people were also housed in three evacuation centers. Another estimate placed over 69,000 total customers without power in the country. Rainfall was less than anticipated, with a report of 50 mm (2.0 in) of rain falling in six hours. Vegetation and crops were damaged as well, though the true extent of the damage is unknown.

=== Elsewhere ===
High waves were also expected to affect Vanuatu, with wave heights up to 8 metres (26 ft) forecasted. Heavy rain from the cyclone was also briefly forecasted to impact Vanuatu. There were no reports of damage in the country.

== See also ==
- Tropical cyclones in 2021
- Cyclone Rewa (1993)
- Cyclone Erica (2003)
- Cyclone Harold (2020) A powerful tropical cyclone that impacted Vanuatu a year before Niran
- Cyclone Ruby (2021)
