= Cyclone Guambe =

South-West Indian Ocean cyclone in 2021

Tropical Cyclone Guambe
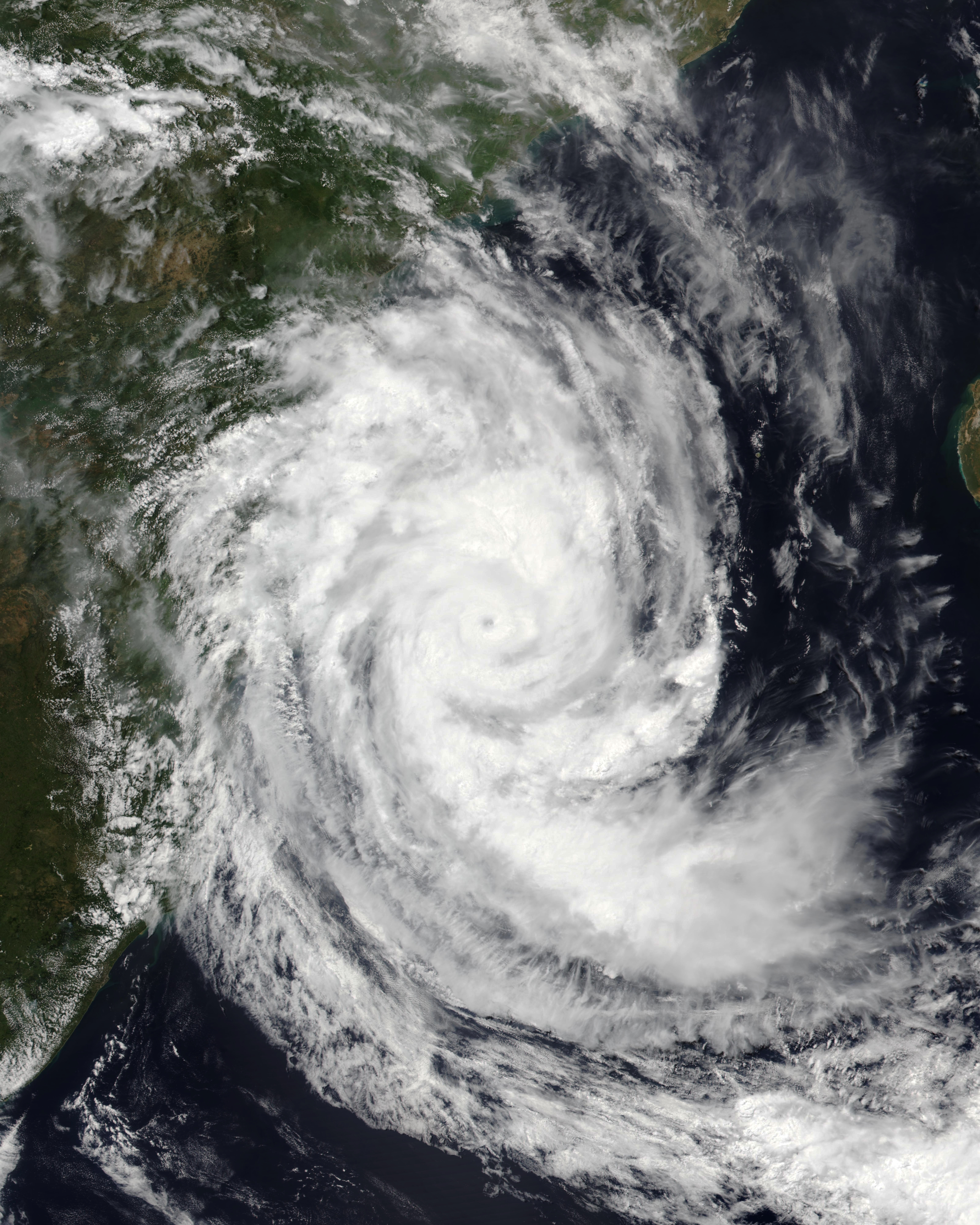
- Guambe near peak intensity east of the coast of Mozambique on 19 February

Meteorological history
- Formed: 11 February 2021
- Post-tropical: 21 February 2021
- Dissipated: 22 February 2021

Tropical cyclone
- 10-minute sustained (MFR)
- Highest winds: 155 km/h (100 mph)
- Highest gusts: 220 km/h (140 mph)
- Lowest pressure: 953 hPa (mbar); 28.14 inHg

Category 2-equivalent tropical cyclone
- 1-minute sustained (SSHWS/JTWC)
- Highest winds: 165 km/h (105 mph)
- Lowest pressure: 960 hPa (mbar); 28.35 inHg

Overall effects
- Fatalities: None reported
- Damage: Unknown
- Areas affected: Madagascar, Mozambique, South Africa, Eswatini
- IBTrACS /
- Part of the 2020–21 South-West Indian Ocean cyclone season

Tropical Cyclone Guambe was the third tropical cyclone to make landfall in the country of Mozambique since December 2020, following Cyclone Eloise and Tropical Storm Chalane. The eleventh tropical depression, eighth named storm, and the fourth tropical cyclone of the 2020–21 South-West Indian Ocean cyclone season, Guambe originated from a tropical disturbance in the Mozambique Channel on 10 February. Two days later, the system developed into a subtropical depression that made landfall in Mozambique. The storm proceeded to make a clockwise loop over the country for the next several days, while dumping prolific amounts of rainfall in the region, before re-emerging into the Mozambique Channel on 16 February. Soon afterward, the system strengthened into a moderate tropical storm and was named Guambe. A couple of days later, Guambe underwent rapid intensification, reaching tropical cyclone status on 19 February, and peaking as a Category 2-equivalent tropical cyclone shortly afterward. Afterward, Guambe underwent an eyewall replacement cycle and weakened back into a severe tropical storm on 20 February. Afterward, Guambe transitioned into an extratropical storm on 22 February. On the next day, Guambe was absorbed into another extratropical cyclone.

After making landfall in Mozambique on 12 February as a subtropical low, Guambe's precursor disturbance caused widespread flooding across Mozambique, which destroyed homes and crops, and also displaced thousands of people weeks after Cyclone Eloise made landfall near the same location. Guambe was estimated to have caused millions of dollars (2021 USD) in damages. No deaths were reported from the storm.

== Meteorological history ==
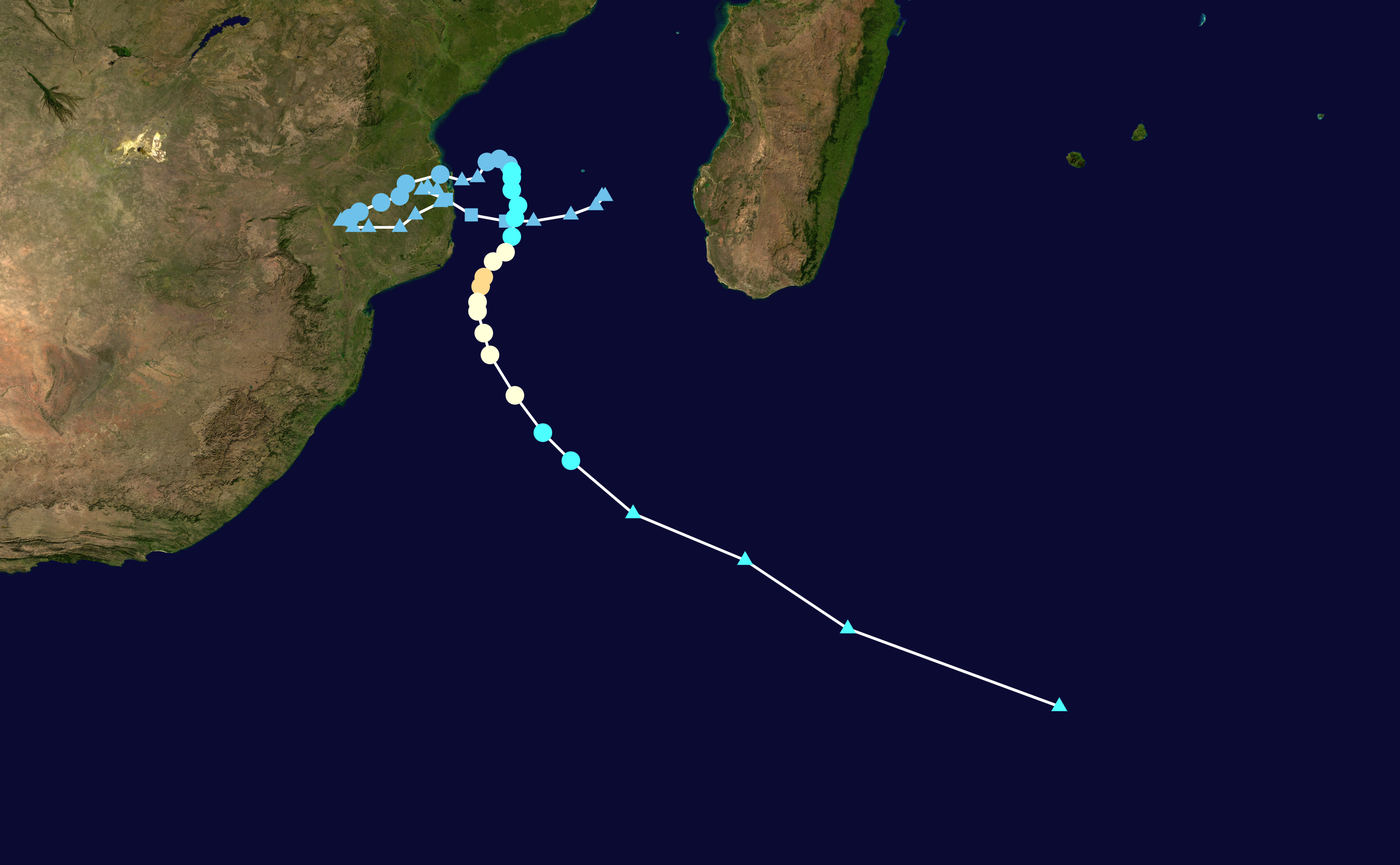
Map plotting the storm's track and intensity, according to the Saffir–Simpson scale Map key Saffir–Simpson scale Tropical depression (≤38 mph, ≤62 km/h) Tropical storm (39–73 mph, 63–118 km/h) Category 1 (74–95 mph, 119–153 km/h) Category 2 (96–110 mph, 154–177 km/h) Category 3 (111–129 mph, 178–208 km/h) Category 4 (130–156 mph, 209–251 km/h) Category 5 (≥157 mph, ≥252 km/h) Unknown Storm type Tropical cyclone Subtropical cyclone Extratropical cyclone, remnant low, tropical disturbance, or monsoon depression

On 10 February, a disturbance developed in the Mozambique Channel between Mozambique and Madagascar. For the next couple of days, the system slowly moved westward, approaching the coast of Mozambique while gradually organizing. On 12 February, Météo-France La Réunion noted that the system had transitioned into a subtropical depression and had made landfall near Inhambane, Mozambique; the subtropical depression was also slowly moving inland without having developed any significant sustained convective activity near the center. The next day, the system was designated as an overland tropical depression, while bringing locally heavy rainfall across portions of southern Mozambique. For the next several days, the system made a slow clockwise loop over Mozambique, while slowly organizing. By 15 February, the meandering system had turned back eastward and was expected to re-emerge into the Mozambique Channel. At 06:00 UTC on 16 February, the system re-emerged over warm open water and was designated as Tropical Disturbance 11. The storm resumed its organizing trend soon afterward, and at 18:00 UTC that day, the MFR upgraded the system to a tropical depression.

On 17 February, the depression turned southward and strengthened into Moderate Tropical Storm Guambe at 12:00 UTC that day, with the northern section of the storm becoming enveloped in deep convection. Around that time, Guambe had a secondary low-level circulation center over northern South Africa, which slowed the storm's southward movement. The storm continued strengthening into the next day as thunderstorm activity became more concentrated around the center of the storm's circulation; however, the lack of upper-level divergence initially limited any significant intensification. Despite this, Guambe eventually strengthened into a severe tropical storm at 18:00 UTC on 18 February. Over the next several hours, Guambe began undergoing rapid intensification, with a well-defined central dense overcast (CDO) configuration developing, as the cyclone continued becoming more organized. Guambe quickly reached tropical cyclone status at 06:00 UTC on 19 February, with the appearance of a very small eye on infrared satellite imagery and a well-defined core structure, even as the storm turned southwestward. Soon afterward, Guambe reached its peak intensity, with 10-minute sustained winds of 155 km/h (96 mph), and a minimum central pressure of 953 millibars (28.1 inHg). Around the same time, the JTWC estimated that Guambe had strengthened into a Category 2-equivalent tropical cyclone on the Saffir–Simpson scale (SSHWS), with 1-minute sustained winds at 155 km/h (96 mph), with the storm's 1-minute sustained wind speed having increased by 65 km/h (40 mph) over a 24-hour period.

The storm's forward motion slowed as Guambe held onto its strength, with the storm's eye disappearing and reappearing on satellite imagery, and sporadic convective bursts. However, Guambe soon began to weaken, with the storm's feeder bands unravelling and cloud tops warming, though the storm managed to maintain a symmetrical structure with a pinhole eye. Despite forecasts of further strengthening, Guambe rapidly weakened back down to severe tropical storm status on 20 February, due to an eyewall replacement cycle, while the storm began accelerating towards the southeast. Guambe further decayed as its rainbands unraveled and its cloud tops warmed, brought on by high wind shear and cool sea surface temperatures. Later on 21 February, Guambe began undergoing an extratropical transition, before completing the transition at 06:00 UTC on the next day, even as the storm began interacting with the southern jet stream. Subsequently, the MFR issued their last advisory on the storm. On 23 February, Guambe was absorbed into another larger extratropical cyclone.

== Preparations and impact ==
After Guambe's precursor disturbance moved ashore in Mozambique on 12 February, the storm proceeded to produce prolific rainfall across the region for the next several days, leading to widespread flooding, and displacing over 27,000 people. The storm washed out two bridges on the Umbeluzi River, flooded hundreds of homes, and also destroyed numerous crops. On 15 February, a prison in southern Mozambique transferred 150 prisoners to another prison facility 80 kilometres (50 mi) away due to the risk of flooding from the storm. The storm struck less than a month after Cyclone Eloise had made landfall near the same place, worsening the ongoing crisis in the region. The storm also caused flooding in parts of northeastern South Africa during this time. As a tropical disturbance, Guambe caused millions of dollars (2021 USD) in damages in South Africa. After Guambe re-emerged into the Mozambique Channel on 16 February and began strengthening, local authorities in Mozambique anticipated the threat of additional flooding from the storm in the southern portion of the country, especially the region between Beira and Inhambane. The mysterious deaths of 186 Spinner dolphins off of Bazaruto Archipelago National Park was thought to be blamed on Cyclone Guambe. However, there were no additional reports of damage to human property as Guambe accelerated southeastward.

== See also ==
- Weather of 2021
- Tropical cyclones in 2021
- Cyclone Idai
- Tropical Storm Chalane
- Cyclone Eloise
- Cyclone Funso
