= Storm Blas =

October 2021 European windstorm in Europe

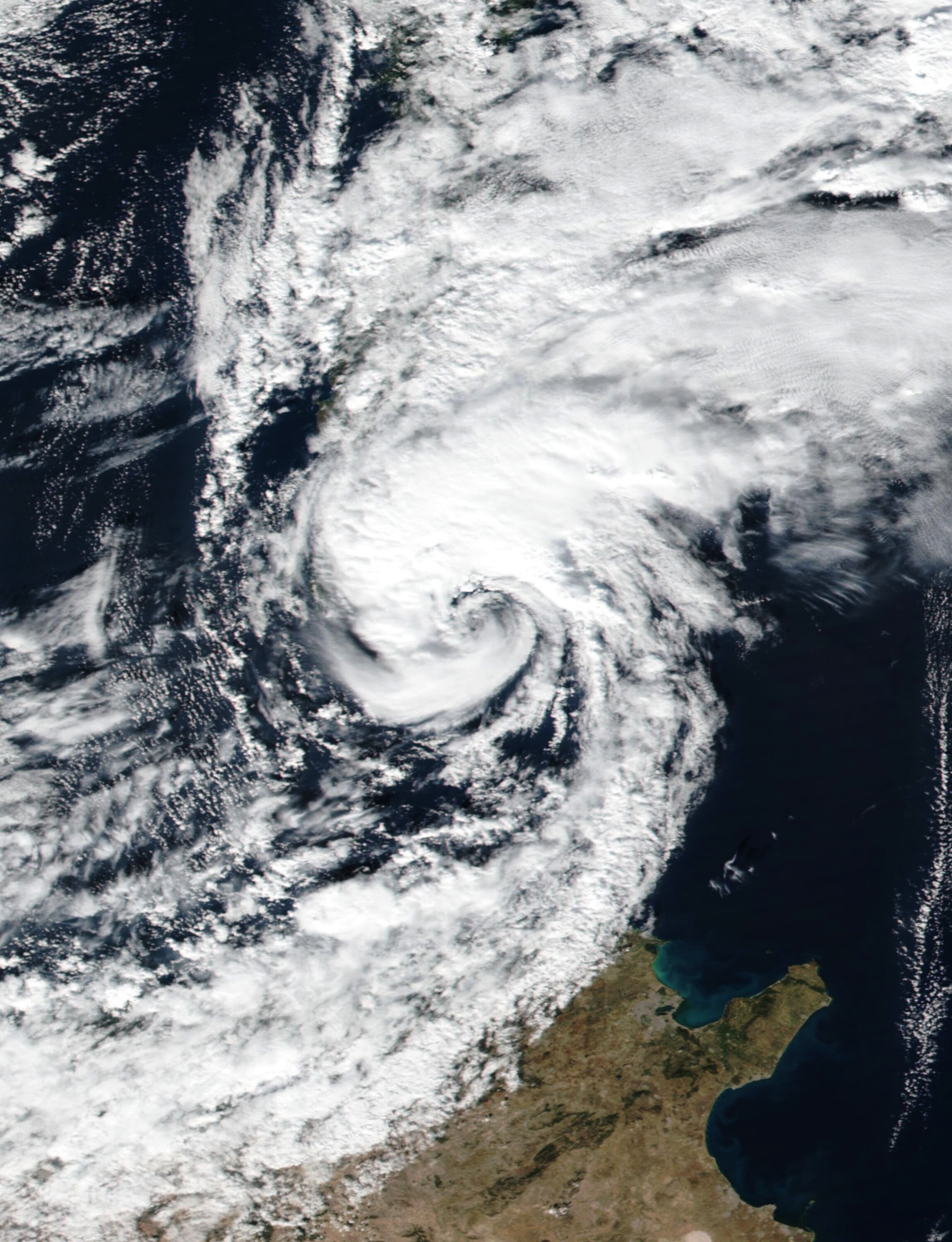
- Storm Blas impacting Sardinia, at 12:01 UTC on 14 November

Meteorological history
- Formed: 5 November 2021
- Dissipated: 18 November 2021

Subtropical storm
- Highest gusts: 140 km/h (87 mph) at Cap Bear, France
- Lowest pressure: 1,010 mb (1,010 hPa)
- Max. rainfall: 118.8 mm (4.68 in) in Escorca, Son Torrella

Overall effects
- Fatalities: 9 total
- Damage: $1 Million (US$)
- Areas affected: Spain (Balearic Islands, east coast of Spain), Algeria, France, Italy, Central Europe
- Part of 2021–22 European windstorm season

Storm Blas was a small extratropical cyclone and Mediterranean tropical-like cyclone that caused devastation and disruption across the Balearic Islands, Spain, France, and Italy during early and mid-November 2021. The storm was named by Agencia Estatal de Meteorología (AEMET) on 5 November, with the agency issuing wind and rain alerts to the Balearic archipelago and other areas reaching the eastern coasts of Spain, as Blas approached from the east. It then turned eastward after moving slowly westward, and the storm meandered across the western Mediterranean for the next several days, before eventually dissipating to the west of Italy on 18 November.

Heavy rainfall and gusty winds impacted the Balearic Islands as a result of Blas, with trees being damaged and many water basins overflowing. A rescue was conducted on 10 November in Mallorca for a stranded crew member of a sailboat. No deaths were reported on the island, but the storm brought property damages on the archipelago. Algeria was also affected by the storm, with numerous landslides being documented over the country, especially Algiers. Six fatalities were reported in the region, with two additional people being injured. Three more deaths occurred in Sicily, along with reported heavy wind gusts in France. A total of 9 deaths were reported from the storm and $1 Million Damage (US$)

== Meteorological history ==
Map plotting the storm's track and intensity, according to the Saffir–Simpson scale Map key Saffir–Simpson scale Tropical depression (≤38 mph, ≤62 km/h) Tropical storm (39–73 mph, 63–118 km/h) Category 1 (74–95 mph, 119–153 km/h) Category 2 (96–110 mph, 154–177 km/h) Category 3 (111–129 mph, 178–208 km/h) Category 4 (130–156 mph, 209–251 km/h) Category 5 (≥157 mph, ≥252 km/h) Unknown Storm type Tropical cyclone Subtropical cyclone Extratropical cyclone, remnant low, tropical disturbance, or monsoon depression

Blas originated from an extratropical low of the coast of Algeria on 5 November. At 10:15 UTC that same day, Blas was named by the Agencia Estatal de Meteorología (AEMET), due to the potential for the storm to bring strong wind gusts to the Balearic Islands. However, the weather map of the Free University of Berlin (FUB), along with satellite imagery available at that time indicated that the storm had no evident circulation at that time. According to AEMET, the storm formed from the process of "Mediterranean cyclogenesis" from a trough that crossed through the Mediterranean Sea from the Atlantic Ocean. On the next day, a synoptic map published by the FUB indicated that Blas had become better-defined between the Balearic Islands and the island of Sardinia. For the next three days, Blas slowly moved west-southwestward, affecting the Balearic Archipelago and the nearby Algeria. On 8 November, Blas initiated a slow clockwise loop for the next five days, looping towards Corsica and then back towards the Balearic Islands, while gradually strengthening. A peak pressure of 1,010 mbar (30 inHg) was reported by the FUB's weather map on 8–9 November, with the storm peaking on 10 November. Around 11 November, Blas exhibited compact convection over its center, resembling a tropical cyclone in appearance, though this was short-lived. On 12 November, Blas' center split into two lows, though they recombined by the next day. The AEMET noted that Blas continued moving towards the east, moving across the Mediterranean and Tyrrhenian Sea, where it caused impacts that were described by the agency as "important". On 13 November, the storm developed a spiral structure similar to those of tropical cyclones while situated near the Balearic Islands, and the storm also shed its frontal structure. The storm then slowly weakened while executing another clockwise loop, with the storm moving southeastward. On 14 November, the cyclone turned northward, moving over Sardinia and Corsica, before curving back southwestward on 15 November and moving over Sardinia again, while restrengthening in the process. On 16 November, Blas turned eastward once again, passing just south of Sardinia and moving towards Italy, before dissipating over the Tyrrhenian Sea on 18 November.

== Impacts ==
=== Spain ===
Highest rainfall received from Blas in the Balearic Islands, according to AEMET
Date	Amount of rainfall in exact place	Reference
5 November	26.4 mm (1.04 in) at Sant Joan de Labritija	
6 November	20.5 mm (0.81 in) at Menorca Airport	
7 November	14.3 mm (0.56 in) at Menorca Airport	
8 November	13.8 mm (0.54 in) at Escorca, Son Torrella	
9 November	114.2 mm (4.50 in) at Escorca, Son Torrella	
10 November	94.8 mm (3.73 in) at Escorca, Son Torrella	
11 November	118.8 mm (4.68 in) at Escorca, Son Torrella	
12 November	73.2 mm (2.88 in) at Escorca, Lluc	
13 November	66.5 mm (2.62 in) at Escorca, Lluc	
14 November	19.4 mm (0.76 in) at Muro, S'Albufera	
15 November	40.3 mm (1.59 in) at Escorca, Lluc	

An orange warning was issued for the Balearic Islands and Gerona in Spain after the AEMET designated the storm, while a yellow warning was issued for the islands' northeast and over Levante. Menorca has also been placed on an orange rain alert. Due to the storm-induced strong waves, the Port of Valencia was also closed to sea activities. According to AEMET, Blas had the potential to acquire subtropical or tropical features while moving across the Mediterranean Sea and become a Medicane, according to AEMET. The forced closure of the ports of Mahón and Ciutadella cut Menorca off from the rest of Spain. A wind gust of 72 km/h (45 mph) was recorded at the island's airport, while Es Mercadal recorded a wind gust of 75 km/h (47 mph). A wave height of 3.7 m (12 feet) was also recorded by a buoy due to Blas. About 5 metres (16 ft), meanwhile was registered at Mallorca's north and northeastern portions. The island's Far de Capdepera reported the highest wind gust from the system at the country, at 95 km/h (59 mph) while Serra d'Alfabia at 88 km/h (55 mph). Several trees were uprooted and felled as a result of these, with firefighters responding to several requests for tree blockages.

A wave height of 7.9 m (26 feet) was also recorded at a port in the Balearic Islands. The heaviest rainfall was received at Escorsa, Son Torella with 118.8 mm (4.68 in) on 11 November. In addition, a small vessel sank off the coast of El Fonduco due to high seas, although no one was injured. Across the archipelago, 143 tree, electrical line, and street lamp blockage occurrences were recorded. Disruption in transportations of fresh products in Menorca was also seen due to the closure of ports leading to the island. The seaports connected to Menorca eventually opened again on 9 November. Minor flooding was also seen over Fornalutx, forcing the cancellation of classes there. Blas also affected Barcelona with heavy rains and rough seas, with beach stores closing and emergency plans activating in the city. Waves up to 2.3–3.3 m (7.5–10.8 feet) also breached some sand on a beach while surfers were prohibited to undergo surfing activities. By 10 November, a sailboat crew was rescued by the emergency authorities in Mallorca as the mast of his vessel broke up. Many river basins also overflowed due to the heavy rains in the island, prompting several alerts for wind and rain.

=== Algeria ===
Heavy rainfall were experienced over the western part of Algeria due to Blas. Over 80 mm (3.1 in) of the downpour was forecasted by the Meteo Algerie for the country's coastal areas. Meanwhile, orange alerts were placed over the said places and inland areas for strong winds. However, these rainfall benefited several sewers and valleys as they were dry due to the drought. Due to storm-related flash floods, many roads were impassable to light vehicles and/or forced to close. Many homes in Chlef Province were also devastated by landslides, and some structures were damaged. Cars were also drowned in the floods, with Civil Protection authorities successfully rescuing two individuals each on Oum El Bouaghi Province and an unnamed street. Three people were also rescued from their homes in Mazouna, Relizane Province, where they were stuck. Snowfall was also reported around the country, causing one motorway to be closed. Due to Blas' rains, a building collapse due to a landslide in a wilaya at Bologhine in the country's capital caused two people to be injured and three more people to be trapped in the establishment's remains; they were later confirmed to be killed. The latter fate also happened to three more individuals at Raïs Hamidou, bringing the death toll from the storm at Algeria at 6. Landslides were also reported at some areas in the capital, causing some property damages.

=== France ===
Cap Bear in France recorded a wind gust of 140 km/h (87 mph), the highest from the system and Leucate at 111 km/h (69 mph). Despite Blas remaining relatively far away from the mainland, the storm brought heavy rainfall to Corsica, with Ghisoni recording a rain accumulation of 229.1 mm (9.02 in) from 9–10 November, slightly above the normal amount for the month of November in the area. More areas reached a rainfall total that is above or in exact the month's normal level: Isolaccio-di-Fiumorbo at 170.7 mm (6.72 in) and Vivario at 167.4 mm (6.59 in), respectively. This caused the Tavignanu and Gravona rivers to swell on 10 November. School transportation operations are also canceled due to Blas.

=== Italy ===
The Mediterranean cyclone 'Blas' generated a phase of extreme bad weather in Sardinia, causing a real storm in the Cagliari area: the flooding caused 107 mm of rain in the centre in 4 hours, 140 mm in Capoterra. According to the French newspaper L'Indépendant, heavy rains, attributed from Blas, killed three people in Sicily.

== See also ==
- Weather of 2021
- Tropical Storm Rolf – Another Medicane that caused severe flooding in some of the same areas in November 2011
- 2021–22 European windstorm season
- Other storms named Blas
