= Tropical Storm Chalane =

South-West Indian Ocean tropical storm in 2020

Severe Tropical Storm Chalane
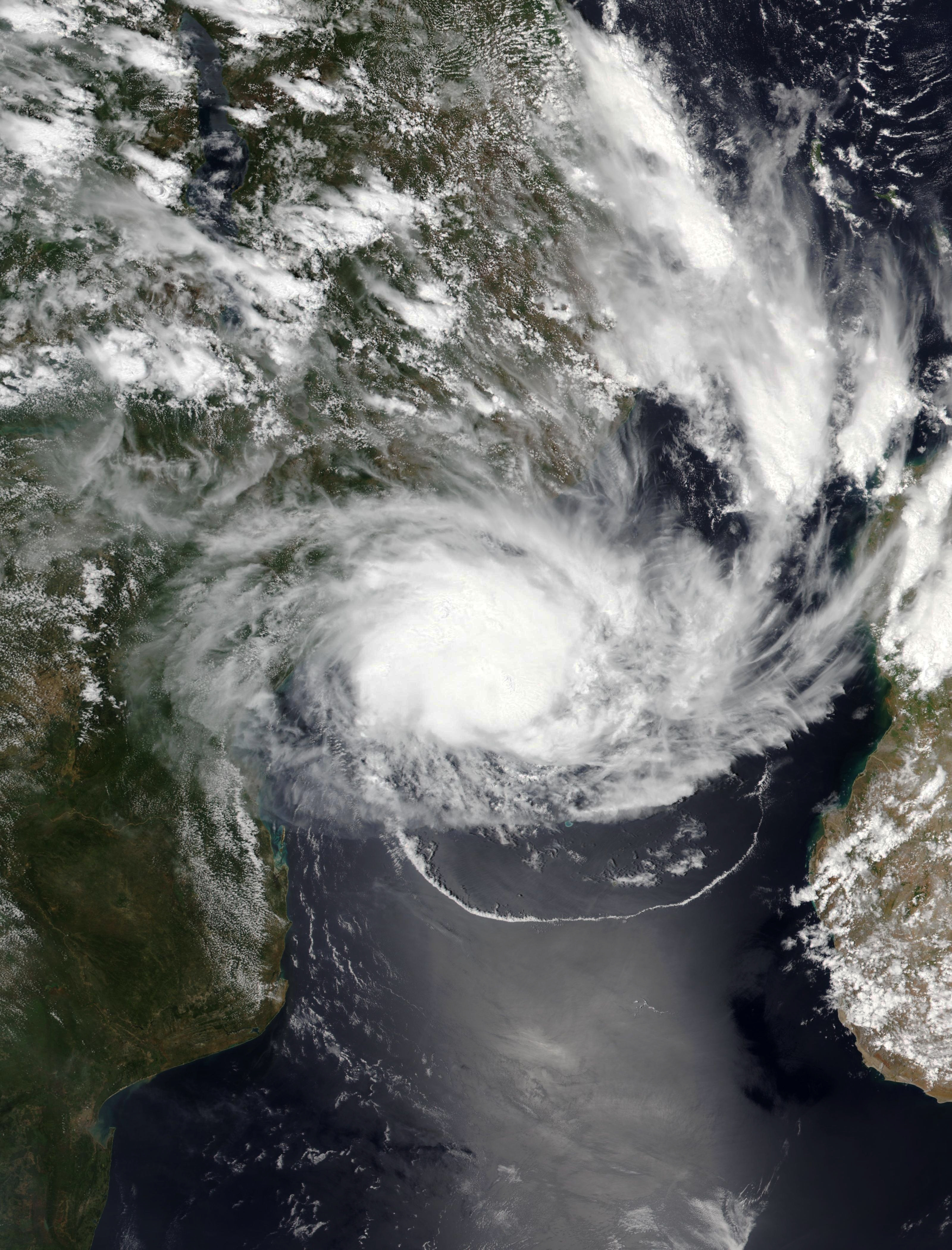
- Severe Tropical Storm Chalane on 29 December, shortly before landfall in Mozambique

Meteorological history
- Formed: 23 December 2020
- Dissipated: 3 January 2021

Severe tropical storm
- 10-minute sustained (MF)
- Highest winds: 110 km/h (70 mph)
- Highest gusts: 155 km/h (100 mph)
- Lowest pressure: 983 hPa (mbar); 29.03 inHg

Category 1-equivalent tropical cyclone
- 1-minute sustained (SSHWS/JTWC)
- Highest winds: 130 km/h (80 mph)
- Lowest pressure: 985 hPa (mbar); 29.09 inHg

Overall effects
- Fatalities: 7 total
- Damage: >$134,000 (2020 USD)
- Areas affected: Madagascar, Mozambique, Zimbabwe, Botswana, Namibia
- IBTrACS /
- Part of the 2020–21 South-West Indian Ocean cyclone season

Severe Tropical Storm Chalane was the first of three consecutive tropical cyclones that struck Mozambique in the 2020–21 South-West Indian Ocean cyclone season. As the fourth tropical depression, third named storm, and second severe tropical storm of the season, Chalane developed out of a zone of disturbed weather which was first monitored RSMC La Réunion on 19 December. Despite conditions slowly becoming unfavorable, the system formed into a tropical depression on 23 December due to the presence of a Kelvin wave and an equatorial Rossby wave, as well as warm sea surface temperatures. The depression soon strengthened into Tropical Storm Chalane on the following day. Chalane made landfall on Madagascar on 26 December and weakened, before emerging into the Mozambique Channel a couple days later. Subsequently, Chalane restrengthened, before making landfall on Mozambique on 30 December. The system weakened as it moved inland, degenerating into a remnant low later that day. However, Chalane's remnants continued moving westward for another several days, emerging into the South Atlantic on 3 January, before dissipating later that day.

As Chalane strengthened, the coordinating of emergency supplies began in Madagascar, Mozambique, and Zimbabwe, and the Joint Typhoon Warning Center issued a Tropical Cyclone Formation Alert (TCFA). Late December 26, Chalane made landfall in Madagascar, causing flooding. But overall, there was little damage. Chalane was downgraded to a tropical depression as it passed through Madagascar. On 30 December, Chalane, now a Severe Tropical Storm, made impact on Mozambique, several institutions were damaged, but Chalane made less damage than expected. The same day, Chalane made landfall in Zimbabwe, before downgrading to a remnant low. The remnant produced additional rainfall in neighboring countries. Overall, 7 people died in Mozambique and the damage was $134,000 (2020 USD).

== Meteorological history ==
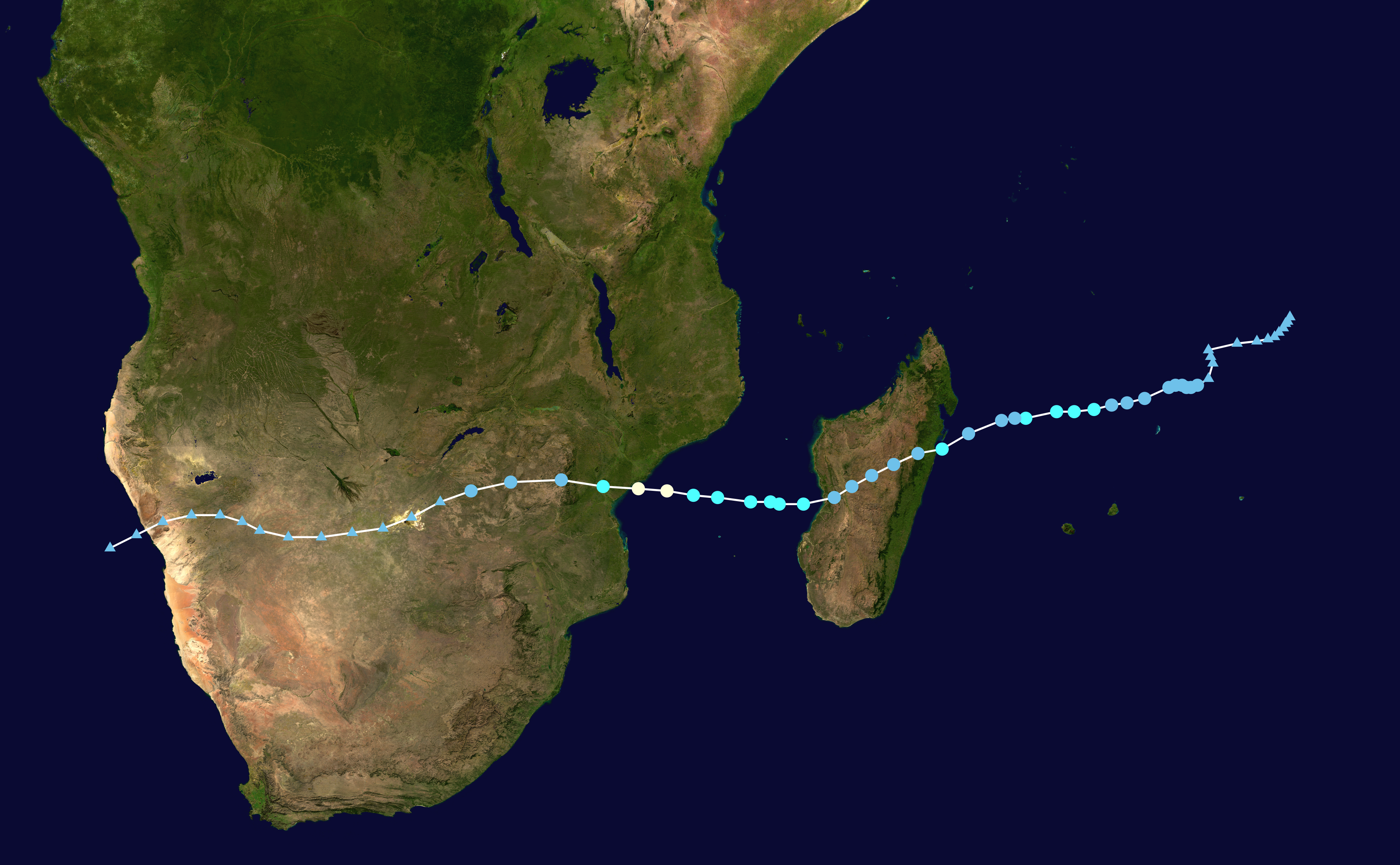
Map plotting the storm's track and intensity, according to the Saffir–Simpson scale Map key Saffir–Simpson scale Tropical depression (≤38 mph, ≤62 km/h) Tropical storm (39–73 mph, 63–118 km/h) Category 1 (74–95 mph, 119–153 km/h) Category 2 (96–110 mph, 154–177 km/h) Category 3 (111–129 mph, 178–208 km/h) Category 4 (130–156 mph, 209–251 km/h) Category 5 (≥157 mph, ≥252 km/h) Unknown Storm type Tropical cyclone Subtropical cyclone Extratropical cyclone, remnant low, tropical disturbance, or monsoon depression

On 19 December, RSMC La Réunion began monitoring a zone of disturbed weather situated approximately 830 km (520 mi) southwest of Diego Garcia. The system was located in a favorable environment for intensification due to the presence of a Kelvin wave and an equatorial Rossby wave, as well as warm sea surface temperatures. Chalane experienced low to moderate vertical wind shear and a good upper-level outflow. Conditions began to deteriorate over the next several days as the system meandered to the west, however the storm managed to reach tropical depression status on 23 December as northerly wind-shear began to affect the storm causing most of the thunderstorm activity and winds to be localized to the south of the center. Approximately a day later at 06:00 UTC 24 December, the depression strengthened to Moderate Tropical Storm Chalane as a scatterometer pass revealed gale-force winds on the southern side of the highly asymmetric wind field. Since the storm was becoming aligned with the subtropical ridge, Chalane began to strengthen, with winds reaching 75 km/h (47 mph) as wind shear decreased. Around the same time, the Joint Typhoon Warning Center issued a Tropical Cyclone Formation Alert (TCFA). At 21:00 UTC that day, the JTWC designated Chalane as Tropical Storm 07S.

However, Chalane continued to struggle from the effects of strong north-northeasterly wind shear. Chalane passed just to the south of Tromelin Island on 25 December where a pressure reading of 1,001.5 hPa (29.57 inHg) was recorded, indicating Chalane had likely weakened while also displaying a deteriorating cloud pattern, therefore Chalane was downgraded back to tropical depression status on 18:00 UTC that day. Slowly, Chalane continued westward towards the Malagasy coastline as a tropical depression. Convective activity remained disorganized while the center accelerated west up to landfall on 26 December at 18:00 UTC in Mahavelona, Madagascar. Chalane degenerated into a surface trough shortly afterwards on 27 December, although its center still remained intact. MFR ceased advisories at this time, as re-intensification was uncertain. Chalane made its passage over Madagascar over the remainder of the day, before emerging over the Mozambique Channel on 28 December, where advisories resumed and Chalane re-developed into a tropical depression. Six hours later, Chalane reintensified into a moderate tropical storm yet again, with the development of a curved band. Chalane continued to strengthen with a central dense overcast bundled with the curved band becoming apparent on satellite imagery Chalane gained severe tropical storm status at 06:00 UTC on 29 December with the formation of an eyewall. Chalane continued to slowly gain strength while in its favorable environment, gaining peak strength 12 hours later with maximum sustained winds of 110 km/h (68 mph) and a pressure of 983 hPa (29.0 inHg). Shortly after peaking, Chalane made landfall north of Beira, Mozambique on 30 December and became subject to weakening. Chalane degenerated into a remnant low later that day over Zimbabwe, as all thunderstorm activity had ceased, and the MRF issued their final advisory on the storm. However, Chalane's remnants continued westward over the next several days, emerging into the South Atlantic on 3 January, before dissipating shortly afterward.

== Preparations and impact ==
On 24 December as Chalane became a tropical storm, officials in Madagascar, Mozambique, and Zimbabwe began coordinating supplies available for storm preparations. Meanwhile, the Department of Climate Change and Meteorological services warned that Chalane could bring strong winds, heavy rainfall, and flooding in Malawi.

=== Mozambique ===
Ahead of the storm, in Mozambique officials in the Zambézia Province handed out kits to people in the path of the storm. Moreover, the government has evacuated people living in the path of the storm, or near rivers to safer areas. The Port town of Beira shut down between 29 December to 31 December as of being in the landfall path of Chalane. LAM Mozambique Airlines cancelled flights from Beira, Chimoio, Nampula, Quelimane, and Tete. Government officials have issued red-level (high risk) tropical storm warnings for the Sofala and Manica provinces, orange-level (moderate risk) tropical storm warning for the Zambezia Province, and yellow-level (low risk) tropical storm warning for the Inhambane Province. As if the region was not already critically devastated by Cyclone Idai in 2019 with thousands displaced from their homes, Chalane made landfall early in the morning on 30 December, with maximum sustained winds of 45 knots (83 km/h; 52 mph). Officials stated that Chalane made less damage than expected. Unfortunately, 7 were killed in Sofala Province and Manica Province provinces, all from drowning in floodwaters. An additional 10 were injured. According to preliminary reports by the National Institute for Disaster Management (INGC), In Sofala Province, at least 10,930 people (2,186 families) have been affected by Chalane. About 1,156 houses were destroyed and 1,439 damaged, about 272 tents in Buzi and Nhamatanda in resettlement sites where people displaced by Cyclone Idai were staying were destroyed, and 82 schools were destroyed and 87 damaged, affecting 22,910 pupils, according to INGC. In Manica Province, 345 people (69 families) were affected, and 68 houses and makeshifts shelters and 13 classrooms were destroyed, while 11 health units were damaged. Electricidade de Moçambique estimated the damage due to Chalane exceed 10 million meticais (US$134,000).

=== Elsewhere ===
==== Madagascar ====
Ahead of time, Madagascar issued a green alert on the regions of Sava and Analanjirofo and the districts of Toamasina. Chalane made landfall in the Fenoarivo Atsinanana District late 26 December, with maximum wind gusts of between 40 and 50 km/h (25 and 31 mph). Chalane struck Madagascar with very heavy rainfall, with Toamasina recording 351 mm of rain in 24 hours on 27 December and Maintirano in the northwestern Melaky Region recorded 131 mm of rain the following day. Gusty winds damaged utility poles and some flooding was reported. However, damage was otherwise very limited in Madagascar.

==== Zimbabwe ====
Zimbabwe's meteorological service issued alerts for flooding, flash flooding, sudden gushes of water, mudslides or landslides, destructive winds and collapse of huts due to excessive moisture on 30 December as now Tropical Depression Chalane passed through the country. When tropical storm warnings where put in place, school reopenings were further delayed by both the inhibiting weather produced by Chalane, and a spike in COVID-19 cases. The government setup shelters in areas prone to flooding. When Chalane finally made impact in the evening of 30 December as a tropical depression, heavy rains and bursts of strong winds were felt in Chimanimani East in Manicaland Province, with some roofs of houses blown off, as well electricity and cellular network disruptions. Minor damage has been reported to a few institutions, including Chimanimani Hospital, Ndima School and a local church. More than 600 people arrived in evacuation centres in Chimanimani District, many of whom have reportedly already begun to return home, while more than 100 refugee families in the Tongogara Refugee Camp in Chipinge District temporarily moved to higher ground.

==== Namibia ====
The remnants of Chalane and a low pressure system caused heavy rain and thunderstorms across the entirety of the country on 2 January. The North Central part of the country reported rain totals up to 150 mm (5.9 in). At least 70 mm (2.8 in) of rain fell in the Gobabis area.

== See also ==
- Weather of 2020
- Tropical cyclones in 2020
- Cyclone Idai – devastating tropical cyclone that made landfall at a similar location in 2019
- Tropical Storm Francisco – took a similar track and made landfall at a similar strength in 2019
- Cyclone Ivan – made a near identical track through Madagascar in 2008
- Cyclone Bonita – devastated the same areas and took a similar track in 1996
- Cyclone Eloise – took a near identical track and impacted Mozambique just weeks after
