= Hurricane Blas (2022) =

Category 1 Pacific hurricane in 2022

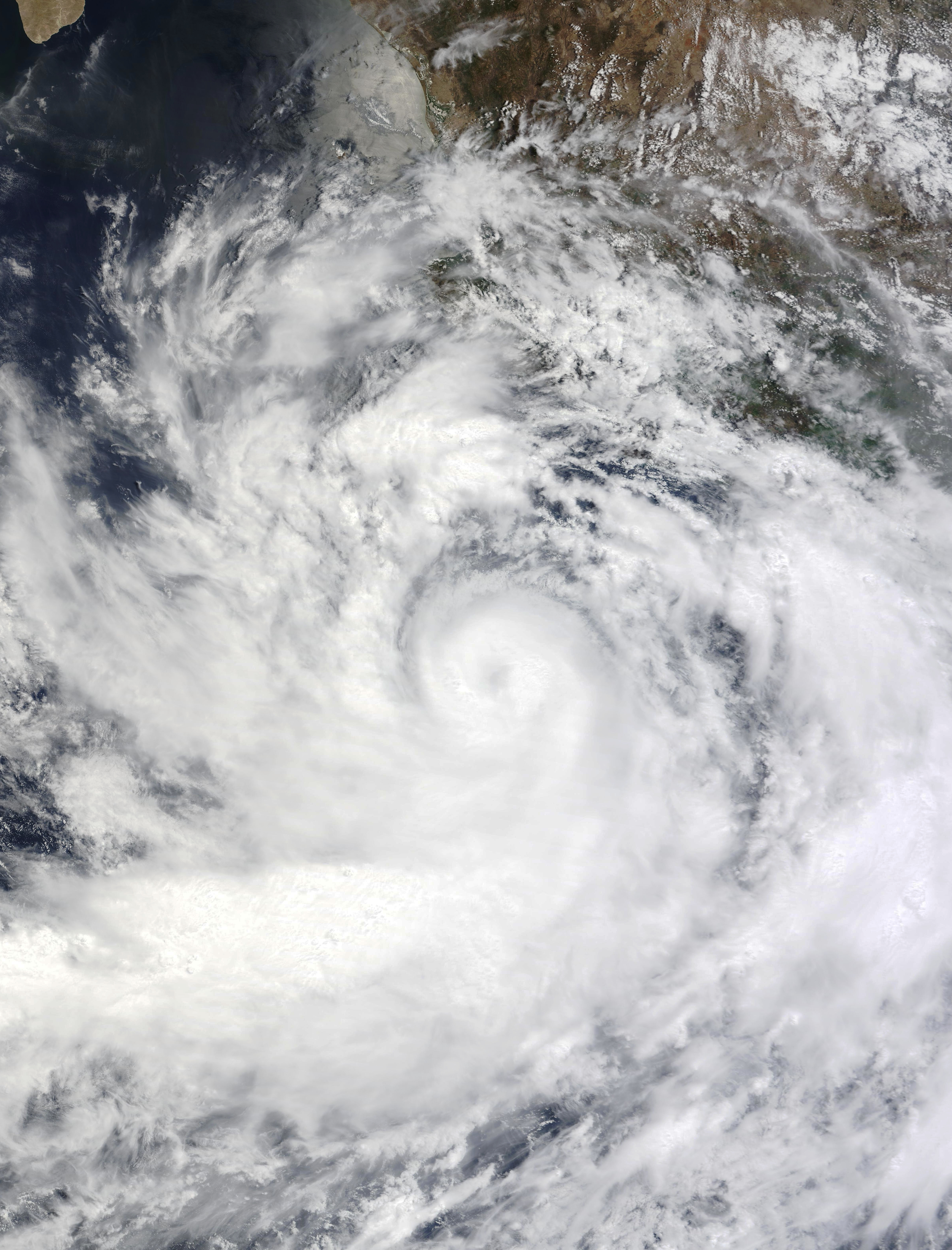
- Blas displaying an eye while intensifying off the Mexican coast on June 16

Meteorological history
- Formed: June 14, 2022
- Post-tropical: June 19, 2022
- Dissipated: June 23, 2022

Category 1 hurricane
- 1-minute sustained (SSHWS/NWS)
- Highest winds: 85 mph (140 km/h)
- Lowest pressure: 978 mbar (hPa); 28.88 inHg

Overall effects
- Fatalities: 4
- Damage: Minimal
- Areas affected: Southwestern Mexico, Revillagigedo Islands
- IBTrACS
- Part of the 2022 Pacific hurricane season

Hurricane Blas was a Category 1 hurricane that brought winds and flooding to several Mexican states in June 2022. The second named storm and second hurricane of the 2022 Pacific hurricane season, Blas developed from a low-pressure area off the coast of southwestern Mexico. It became a tropical depression on June 14. and strengthened into a tropical storm later that same day. Blas became a hurricane the next day, while paralleling the coast. The system reached its peak intensity on June 16, at 00:00 UTC, with maximum sustained winds of 75 knots (85 mph; 140 km/h) and a central pressure of 978 mbar (28.88 inHg). Later, Blas turned to the west and weakened, becoming a tropical storm, before transitioning into a post-tropical cyclone on June 19.

Damage from the hurricane was minor as it remained offshore. All totaled, Blas was responsible for the deaths of four people in Mexico.

== Meteorological history ==
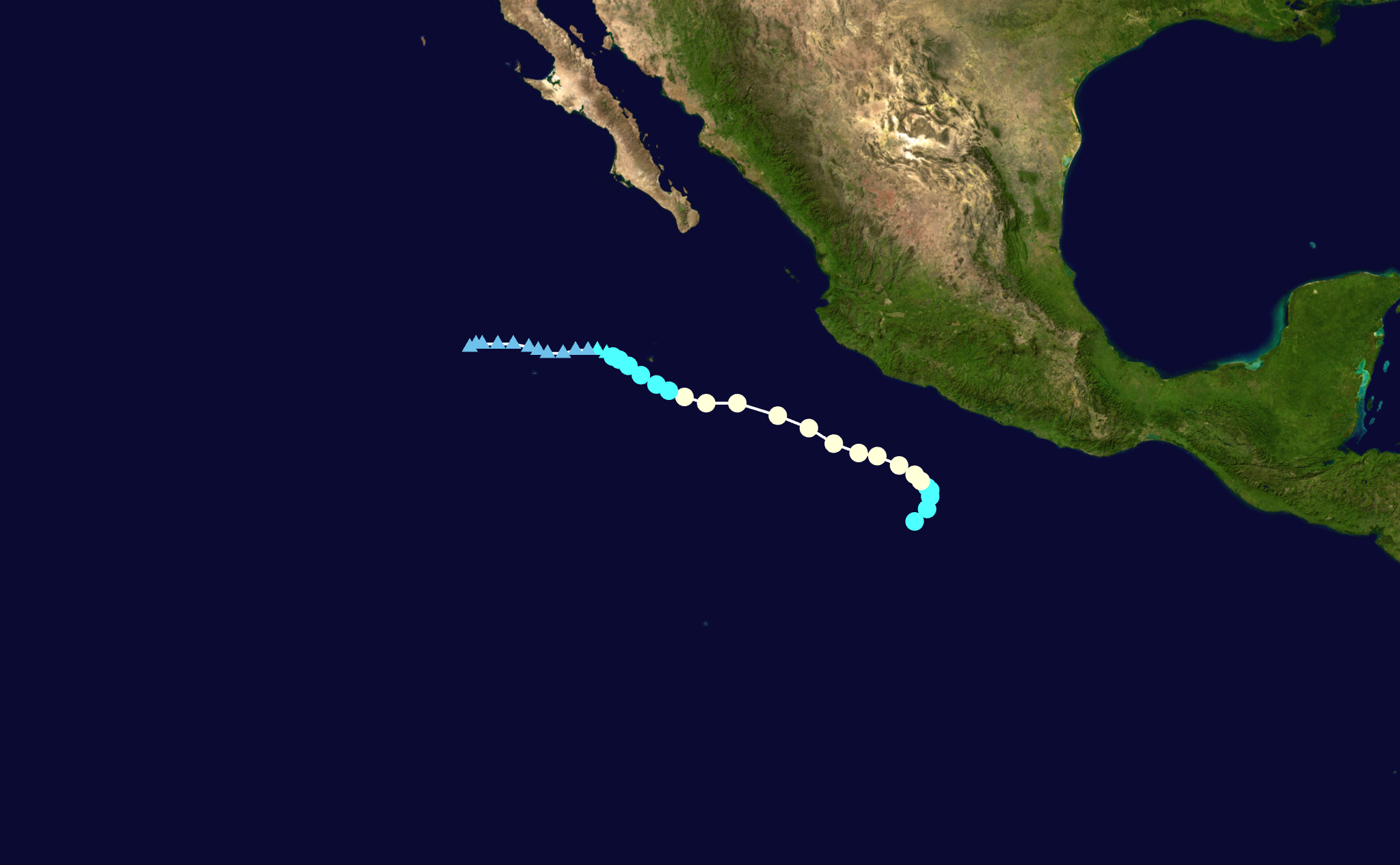
Map plotting the storm's track and intensity, according to the Saffir–Simpson scale Map key Saffir–Simpson scale Tropical depression (≤38 mph, ≤62 km/h) Tropical storm (39–73 mph, 63–118 km/h) Category 1 (74–95 mph, 119–153 km/h) Category 2 (96–110 mph, 154–177 km/h) Category 3 (111–129 mph, 178–208 km/h) Category 4 (130–156 mph, 209–251 km/h) Category 5 (≥157 mph, ≥252 km/h) Unknown Storm type Tropical cyclone Subtropical cyclone Extratropical cyclone, remnant low, tropical disturbance, or monsoon depression

On June 7, the National Hurricane Center (NHC) began tracking a disturbance with potential for potential tropical development south of the Gulf of Tehuantepec. Late on June 10, a broad low-pressure area formed off the coast of southwestern Mexico, producing disorganized showers and thunderstorms in an environment conducive for gradual development. By 09:00 UTC on June 14, the low had become a tropical depression while it was situated about 395 mi (636 km) south-southeast of Manzanillo, Colima. Six hours later, the depression strengthened into a tropical storm, and was assigned the name Blas. The storm's convective organization continued to improve through the day according to satellite imagery, maintaining a well-defined structure and developing prominent convective banding features, as a circular central dense overcast overcast became embedded on the system. On June 15, Blas began to rapidly intensify as it developed an inner core, and at 15:00 UTC that day, it became a Category 1 hurricane on the Saffir–Simpson scale. Blas then developed a mid-level eye on the western portions of the cyclone, then maintained its intensity due to very cold cloud tops near the center and a strong upper-level outflow in three of the storm's quadrants.

Blas strengthened slightly on June 16, with its maximum sustained winds increasing to near 85 mph (137 km/h) and a minimum central barometric pressure of 978 mbar (28.88 inHg). Soon after, the cyclone began to weaken as it moved westward. At 06:00 UTC on June 18, Blas weakened to a tropical storm due to the mid-level center being sheared off to the southwestern side of the storm combined with colder sea surface temperatures as it moved north-west, with no deep convection near the surface center. The storm continued to weaken that day, with satellite images showing a partially exposed low-level center with convection confined to the southeastern quadrant of its circulation.

Despite persistent wind-shear and transiting over cool waters with temperatures below 79 °F (26 °C), Blas maintained limited convection on the eastern half into June 19. However, by 18:00 UTC that same day, all convection collapsed. With no convection remaining in association with Blas, the NHC downgraded the storm to a post tropical cyclone. The remnant low later dissipated over the northern Pacific on June 23.

== Preparations and impact ==
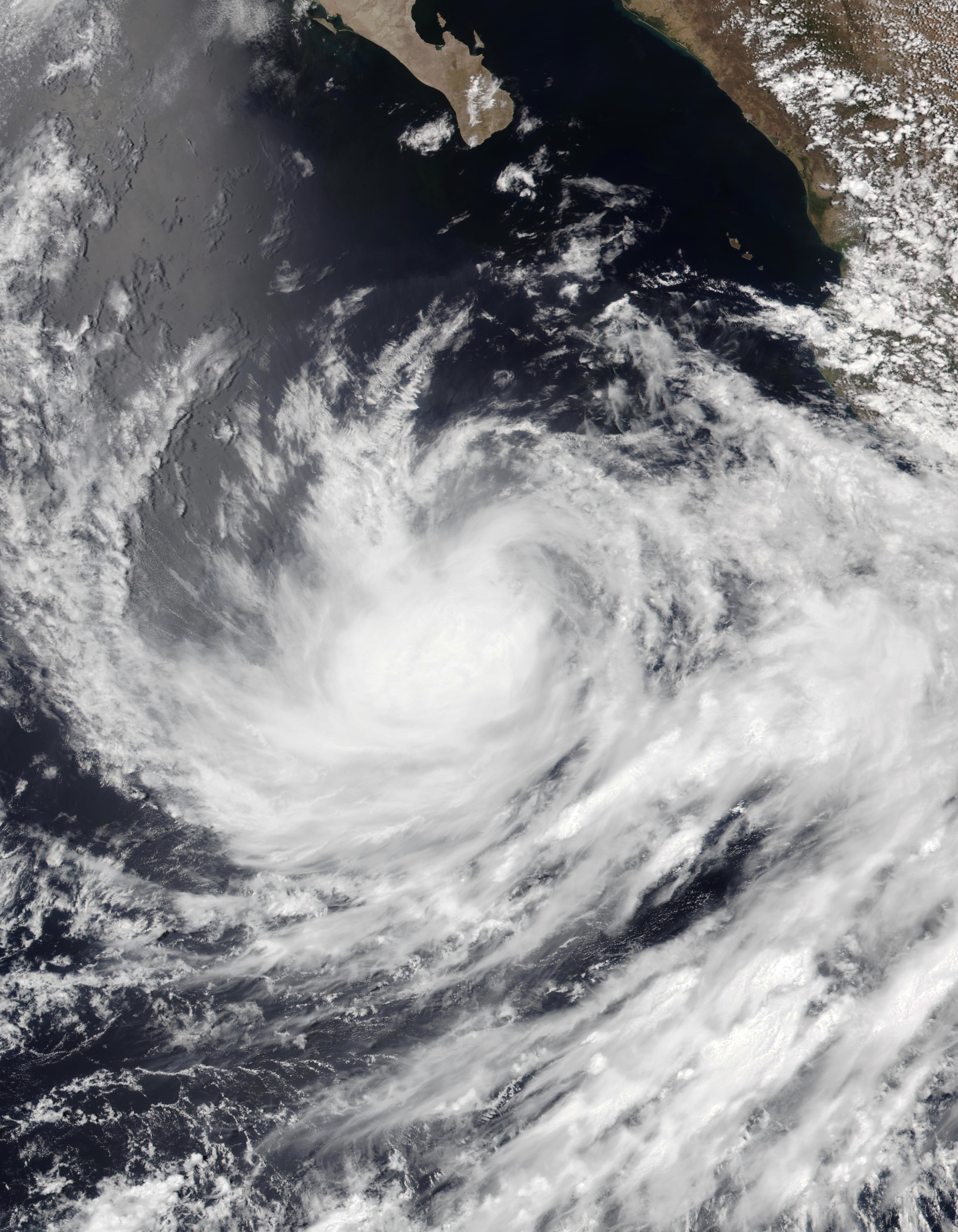
Hurricane Blas starting to weaken on June 17

On June 16, state authorities in Oaxaca placed 60 municipalities, all still recovering from the impacts of Hurricane Agatha, on alert as Blas neared. Ports were also closed. In the state of Guerrero, schools were closed across 21 municipalities, including: Costa Chica, Costa Grande, and Acapulco; classes were also suspended in Michoacán. Blas was responsible for four deaths. Two bodies were found at a beach in Acapulco with the cause of death unknown, but presumed to be storm-related. One Acapulco resident sustained injuries after a wall collapsed in her home. In the state of Puebla, two people were killed by a landslide in Eloxochitlán.

Blas caused only minor damage in Guerrero according to local authorities. At Acapulco, winds and rains from Blas caused beach erosion of over 980 ft (300 m) in length from El Morro beach. In Tecpán de Galeana, several acres (hectares) of banana crops were destroyed by strong winds. Two streams overflowed in Acapulco, flooding eight neighborhoods. Flooding was also reported in Manzanillo and Villa de Álvarez in Colima. Power outages were reported in Zihuatanejo and in Atoyac.

Authorities in Nayarit said that at least 100 people had been displaced by flooding in that state in the aftermath of the hurricane. Governor Miguel Ángel Navarro Quintero pledged that actions would be taken to rebuild the houses destroyed by the storm. Soon after Blas passed, the National Guard was activated to help in the cleanup and removal of debris in Michoacán and Guerrero.

== See also ==
- Weather of 2022
- Tropical cyclones in 2022
- Other storms named Blas
- List of Category 1 Pacific hurricanes
- Hurricane Cosme (2013)
- Hurricane Linda (2015)
- Tropical Storm Ileana (2018)
