= List of storms named Blas =

The name Blas has been used for eight tropical cyclones in the East Pacific Ocean and one medicane in the Mediterranean Sea.

In the East Pacific:

- Tropical Storm Blas (1980) – never threatened land
- Tropical Storm Blas (1986) – did not affect land
- Tropical Storm Blas (1992) – never affected land
- Hurricane Blas (1998) – Category 4 hurricane that paralleled southwestern Mexico before moving out to sea
- Tropical Storm Blas (2004) – never affected land
- Tropical Storm Blas (2010) – remained over the open sea
- Hurricane Blas (2016) – Category 4 hurricane that never threatened land
- Hurricane Blas (2022) – Category 1 hurricane that paralleled southwestern Mexico coastline causing flooding

In the Mediterranean:

- Storm Blas (2021) – affected the Balearic Islands, Sardinia and Corsica

== See also ==
- Cyclone Baaz (2005) – a North Indian Ocean tropical cyclone with a similar name
