= Global Disaster Alert and Coordination System =

The Global Disaster Alert and Coordination System (GDACS), renamed as Global Disaster Awareness and Coordination System in November 2025, is a joint initiative of the United Nations Office for the Coordination of Humanitarian Affairs (OCHA) and the European Commission that serves to consolidate and improve the dissemination of disaster-related information, to improve the coordination of international relief efforts. It was established in 2004 and is a multi-hazard disaster monitor and notification system for earthquakes, tsunamis, floods, volcanoes, and tropical cyclones. It was created to reduce the various monitor websites for the different disaster types. It started as GDAS but was later coupled with the coordination information system of OCHA (the OCHA Virtual OSOCC). GDACS collects near real-time hazard information and combines this with demographic and socio-economic data to perform a mathematical analysis of the expected impact. This is based on the magnitude of the event and possible risk for the population. The result of this risk analysis is distributed by the GDACS website and notifications are sent via email, fax, and SMS to subscribers in the disaster relief community, and all other persons that are interested in this information.
