= Post-tropical cyclone =

Tropical cyclone that has lost tropical characteristics

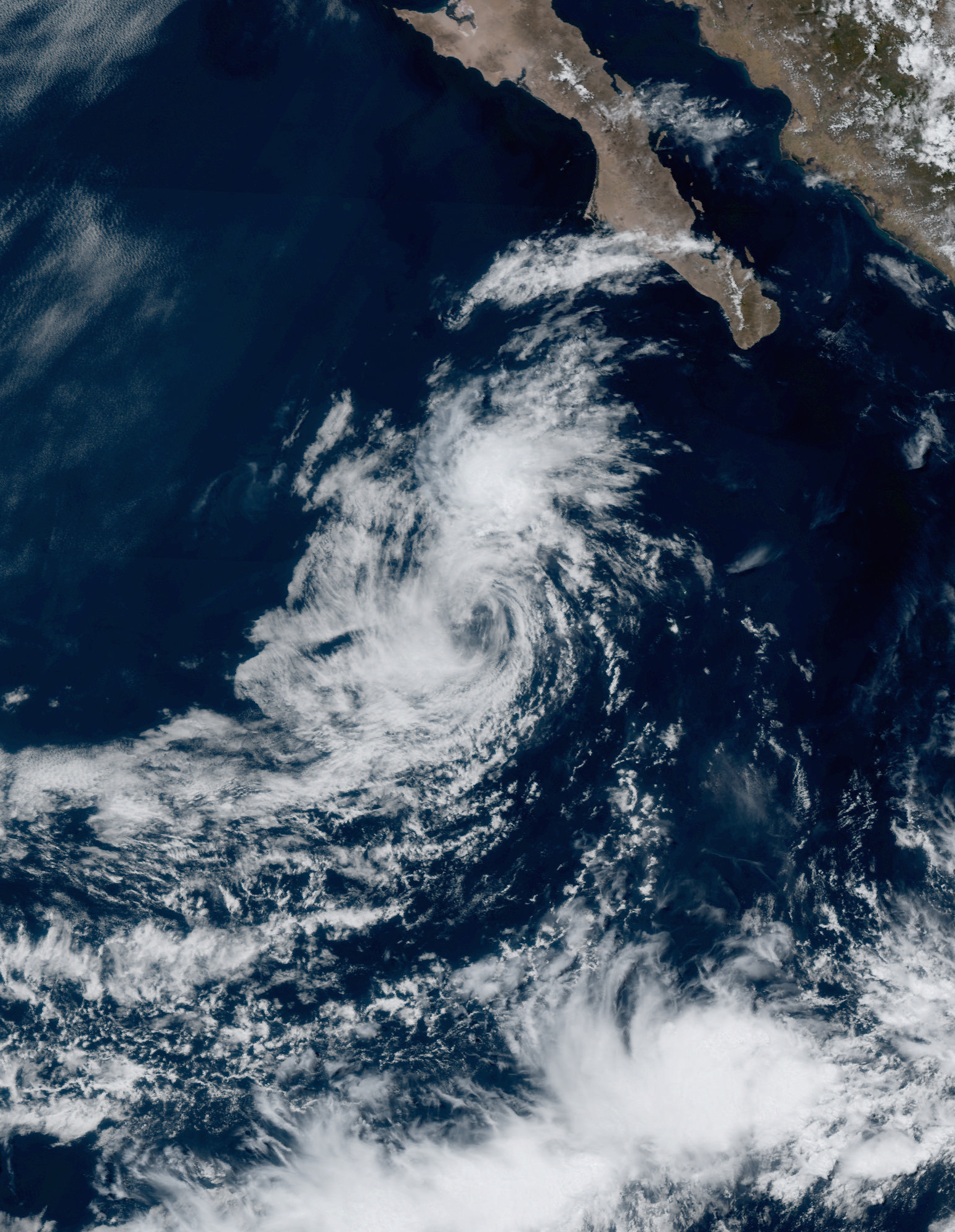
Hurricane Blas' remnant low. Note the lack of convection and fronts connected to the low.

A post-tropical cyclone is a former tropical cyclone that no longer possesses enough tropical qualities to be considered a tropical cyclone. The word may refer to a former tropical cyclone undergoing extratropical transition or a tropical cyclone degenerating into a remnant low. A tropical cyclone degenerating into a trough or wave, or having its low level circulation dissipate overland, lacks a cyclonic circulation and is referred as remnants instead of a post-tropical cyclone. However, post-tropical cyclones or remnants can continue producing high winds and heavy rains.

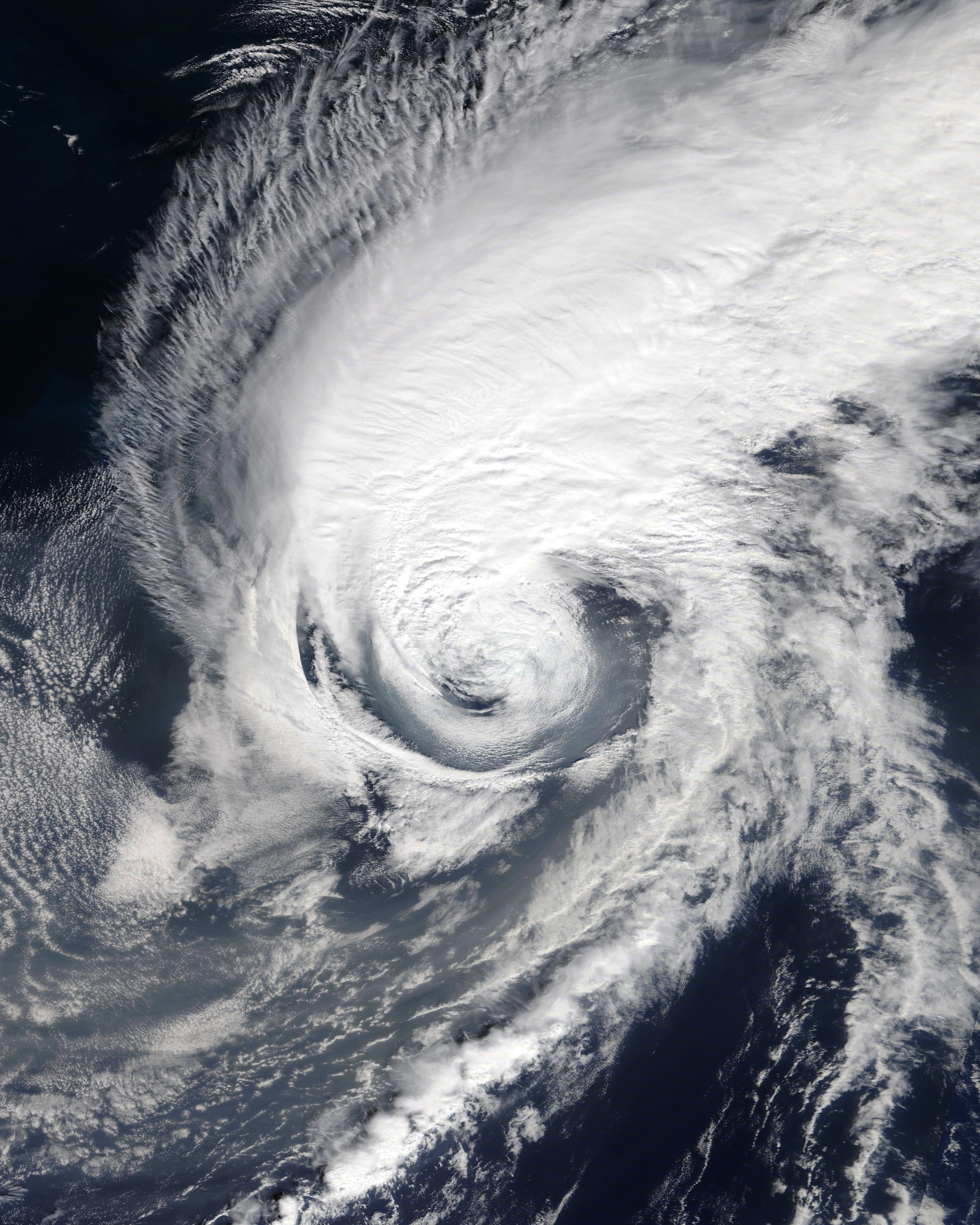
Hurricane Paulette becoming post-tropical on September 16, 2020.

== Classification/Other post-tropical cyclones ==
=== Classes ===
Two classes of post-tropical cyclones exist

- Extratropical cyclone, which is frontal, sometimes still retains winds of hurricane or tropical storm force. Hurricane Paulette (2020) provides a recent example of an extratropical cyclone, in which it no longer has a warm core in higher latitudes when it was over Nova Scotia and all points north in its trajectory.
- Remnant low, which is non-frontal, has maximum sustained winds of less than 34 knots, and mainly consists of stable stratocumulus with little to no convective activity. These shallow systems may meander for some time before opening into a trough of low pressure, or by being absorbed into an extratropical cyclone.

=== Other post-tropical cyclones ===
Not all systems fall into the above two classes. According to the guideline, a system without frontal characteristics but with maximum winds above 34 knots may not be designated as a remnant low. It should be merely described as post-tropical. A few examples falling into this grey area are listed below.

- Eugene (2011)
- Michael (2012)
- Nadine (2012)
- Humberto (2013)
- Joaquin (2015)
- Matthew (2016)
- Jerry (2019)
- Paulette (2020)
- Guambe (2021)
- Linda (2021)
- Batsirai (2022)
- Emnati (2022)
- Blas (2022)
- Frank (2022)
- Howard (2022)
- Kay (2022)

However, there has been an occasion that the United States National Hurricane Center went against that definition and designated Calvin (2011) as a 35-knot remnant low. Also, if a tropical cyclone degenerates into a tropical wave or trough, then it does not qualify as a post-tropical cyclone. It would be referred as the "remnants of (tropical cyclone name)".

Météo-France classifies systems in the South-West Indian Ocean undergoing an extratropical transition or losing tropical characteristics as "post-tropical depressions", since the 2012–13 cyclone season. They would be re-classified as extratropical depressions after completing the process.

== Formation ==
A post-tropical cyclone is formed when the typical characteristics of a tropical cyclone are replaced with those of extratropical cyclones, otherwise known as extratropical transition. After the initial formation, a post-tropical cyclone has the potential to gain strength and intensity by forming an extratropical storm. If a post-tropical cyclone does become an extratropical storm, it will eventually decay through the process of occlusion.

== Impacts ==
The re-intensification of a post-tropical cyclone can cause dangerous conditions in North Atlantic shipping routes with high seas and winds comparable to those of hurricanes.

== Origin ==
The terminology was initiated by Meteorologist Peter Bowyer of the Canadian Hurricane Centre in 1998 during Tropical Storm Bonnie. In 2008, the National Hurricane Center used this term for Tropical Storm Laura to address the limitation of the two classes (extratropical/remnant low) mentioned above. The term was later adopted by the National Weather Service on May 15, 2010.

== Synonym ==
The Bureau of Meteorology in Australia refers to a former tropical cyclone as an "ex-tropical cyclone". An example is ex-tropical cyclone Oswald.

== See also ==
- Glossary of tropical cyclone terms
