= 2021–22 Australian region cyclone season =

Cyclone season in Australia

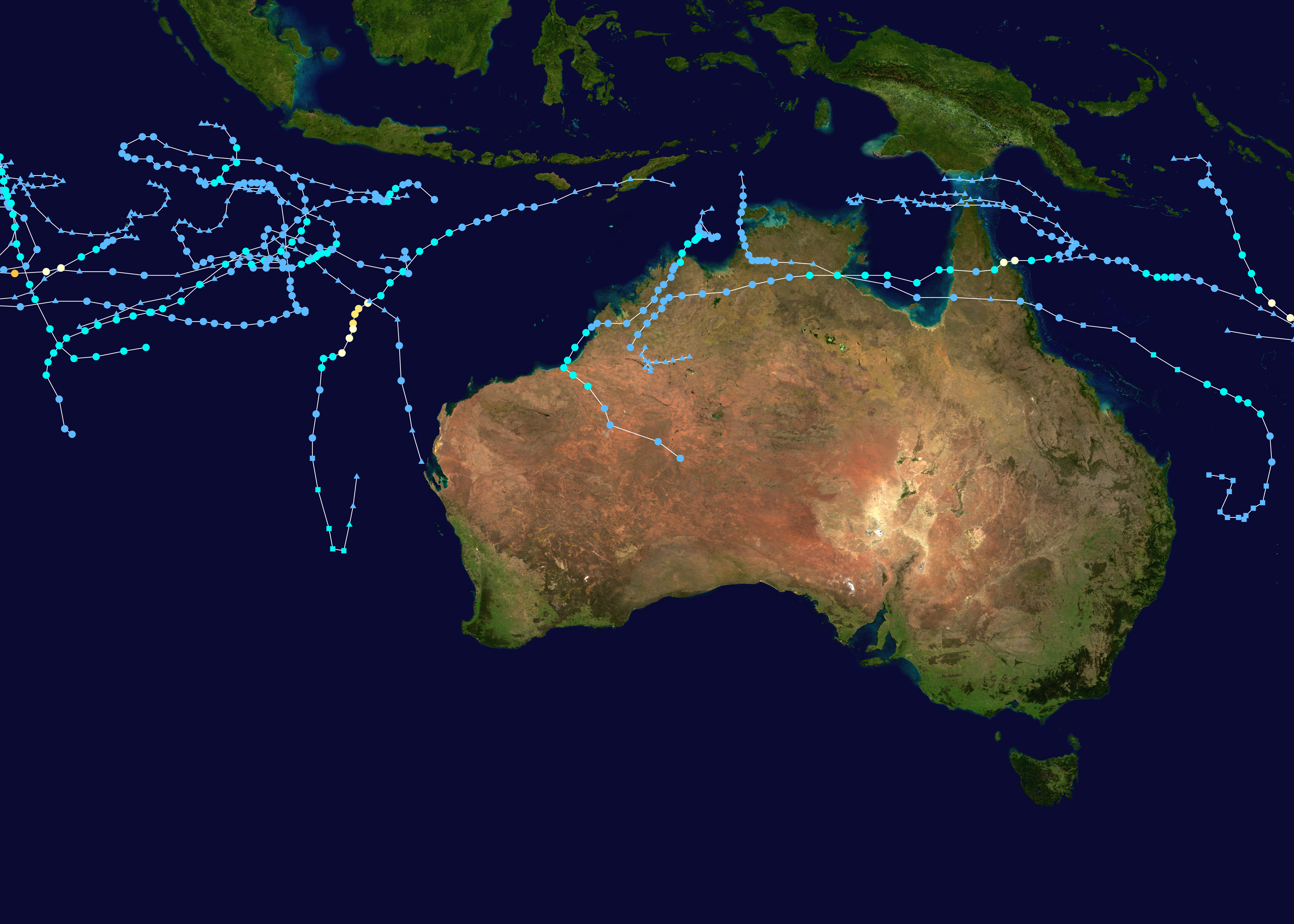
- Season summary map

Seasonal boundaries
- First system formed: 9 November 2021
- Last system dissipated: 31 May 2022

Strongest storm
- Name: Vernon
  - Maximum winds: 185 km/h (115 mph) (10-minute sustained)
  - Lowest pressure: 950 hPa (mbar)

Seasonal statistics
- Tropical lows: 31 (record high)
- Tropical cyclones: 10
- Severe tropical cyclones: 2
- Total fatalities: 4
- Total damage: $80 million (2021 USD)

Related articles
- 2021–22 South-West Indian Ocean cyclone season; 2021–22 South Pacific cyclone season

The 2021–22 Australian region cyclone season, despite a record high number of tropical lows forming, was slightly below-average in terms of activity, with ten tropical cyclones forming, two of which intensified further into severe tropical cyclones. The season began from 1 November 2021 and ended on 30 April 2022, but a tropical cyclone could form at any time between 1 July 2021 and 30 June 2022 and would count towards the season total. During the season, tropical cyclones will be officially monitored by one of the three tropical cyclone warning centres (TCWCs) for the region which are operated by the Australian Bureau of Meteorology, National Weather Service of Papua New Guinea and the Indonesian Agency for Meteorology, Climatology and Geophysics. The United States Joint Typhoon Warning Center (JTWC) and other national meteorological services including Météo-France and the Fiji Meteorological Service also monitored the basin during the season. This season marked the fifth consecutive year that the TCWC Jakarta named a system, with the agency naming Tropical Cyclone Teratai early December.

== Season summary ==
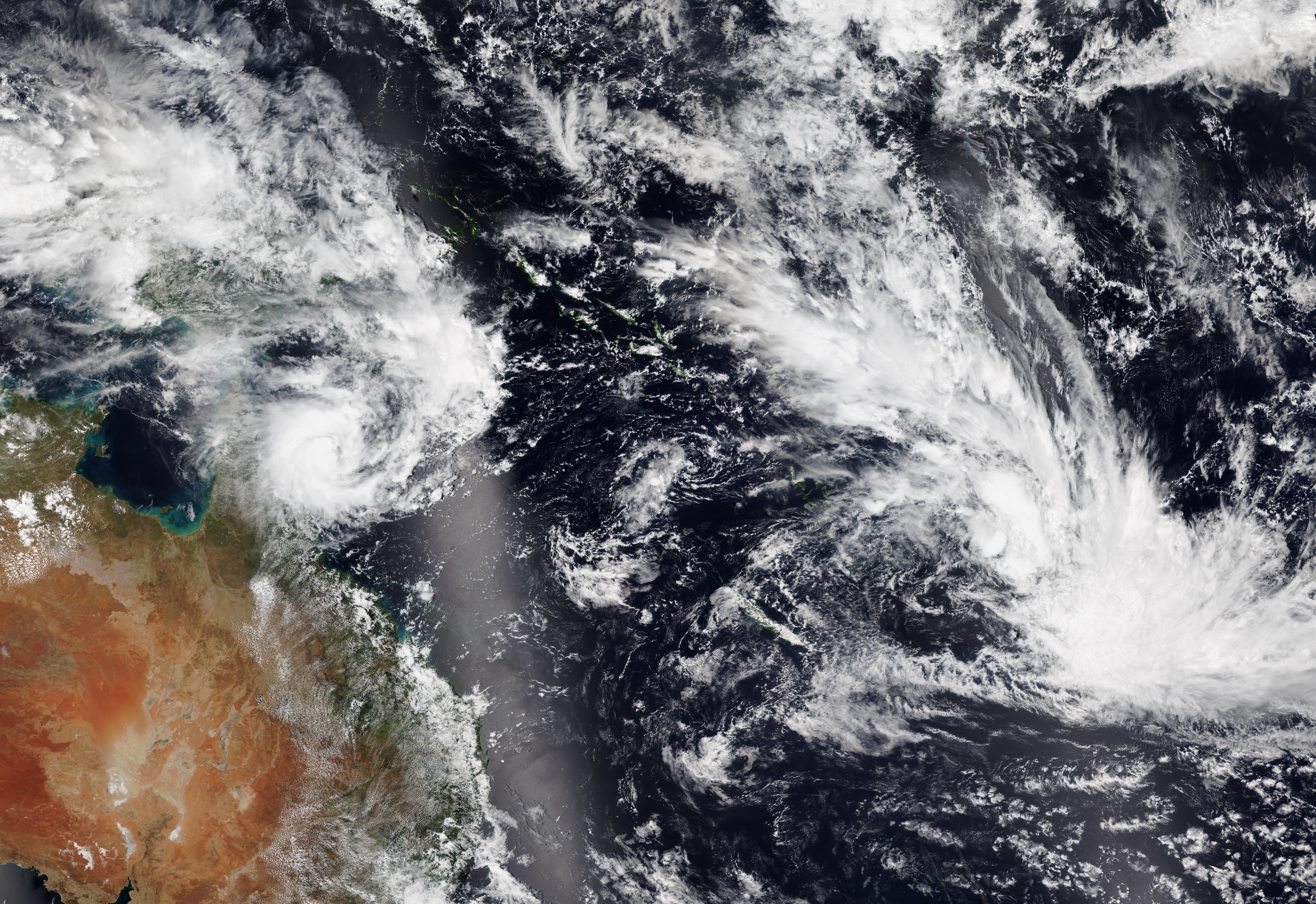
Cyclone Cody and Cyclone Tiffany active on 9 January

A tropical low developed to the north of the Western Region on 9 November, starting the season and the overall Southern Hemisphere season as well. After passing near the Cocos Islands with rainfall, it exiting the basin into the South-West Indian Ocean region on 14 November. Three days later, Tropical Low 02U formed near the Christmas Island and later became Tropical Cyclone Paddy, the first named cyclone in this season. On 22 November, Tropical Low 03U formed and it exited the basin on 28 November. On 1 December, Tropical Cyclone Teratai was designated by TCWC Jakarta, but BoM downgraded to a tropical low later that day due to limited deep convection. Ex-Teratai was monitored for redevelopment for a few days, and on 7 December, the system was re-upgraded to tropical storm status. The system later dissipated on 11 December. On 9 December, BoM designated Tropical Low 07U and later became Tropical Cyclone Ruby, which peaked as a Category 2 tropical cyclone before entering the South Pacific basin. About two weeks later, Tropical Low 08U was monitored for development but made landfall before further strengthening could occur. The tropical low later entered the Coral Sea where Tropical Cyclone Seth peaked with winds of 70 mph. A couple days after Seth dissipated, Tropical Low 10U quickly organized and was named Tiffany. The tropical cyclone rapidly intensified to a Category 1-equivalent tropical cyclone before making landfall over Northern Queensland. Land interaction and wind shear significantly weakened the system. Tiffany later made a second landfall over Northern Territory without restrengthening much over the Gulf of Carpentaria. On 23 January, a tropical low was monitored for a couple days before entering the South-West Indian Ocean, which later became Cyclone Batsirai and caused devastation to Madagascar. On 29 January, BoM started to track Tropical Low 16U and exited the basin without affecting land. Meanwhile, Tropical Low 14U caused record flooding in the Kimberly Region.

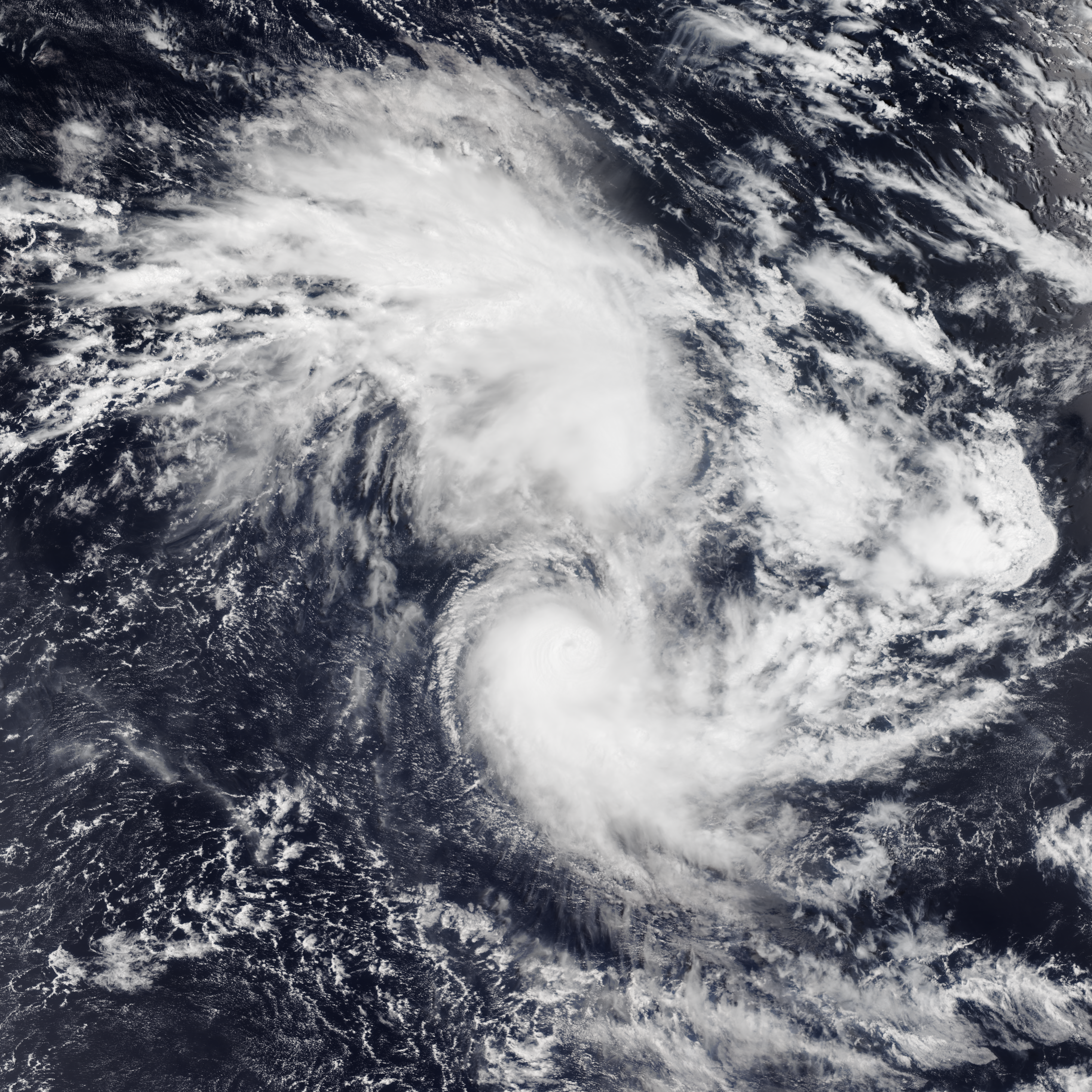
Cyclone Vernon and Tropical Depression 08 undergoing a Fujiwhara interaction on 26 February

A week later, Tropical Low 17U formed and initially the system had deep convection and a well defined center, but easterly shear and dry air prevented strengthening and was last noted on 14 February. On 13 February, Tropical Low 19U formed southeast of Christmas Island and exited the basin a few days later, which was later designated as Moderate Tropical Storm Fezile. On 23 February, Tropical Low 22U quickly developed deep convection and an inner core, and BoM upgraded the system to Tropical Cyclone Vernon. Afterward, the system underwent rapid intensification and peaked as a Category 4 severe tropical cyclone before interacting with Tropical Low 25U. While Vernon stayed out to sea and entered the South-West Indian Ocean, Tropical Low 21U developed in the Torres Strait, but high wind shear prevented further development. At the same time, Tropical Low 23U was monitored in the Timor Sea and later became Tropical Cyclone Anika before making landfall northeast of Kalumburu. Anika made a second landfall east of Pardoo, and briefly developed a better inner core inland due to the brown ocean effect. Tropical Low 26U was also monitored for development east of Christmas Island and attained tropical storm force winds, but high easterly wind shear caused the system to disintegrate. On 11 March, Tropical Low 27U formed south of Java and quickly developed an inner core before being named Billy and stayed out to sea as the system eventually succumbed to high wind shear. A few days later, Tropical Low 28U formed southwest of Sumba and was later named Charlotte. The tropical cyclone rapidly intensified quicker than expected and peaked as a Category 3-equivalent tropical cyclone while attempting to clear out a pinhole eye. However, the peak was relatively short-lived as the convection got sheared and Charlotte transitioned to an extratropical cyclone. On 30 March, Tropical Low 30U formed on Christmas Island and dissipated a couple days later. Another tropical low formed on 8 April, but did not impact any habitable areas. In mid-April, Tropical Low 33U formed in the Gulf of Carpentaria and dissipated a few days later. Tropical Low 34U also formed, but did not impact land. Around its peak, there was an eye-like feature, but northwesterly shear caused the system to become disorganized.

During the off-season, Tropical Cyclone Karim entered the basin on 7 May and did not pose a threat to land. Another tropical low formed on 28 May, but remained disorganized due to wind shear and brought some rainfall to Western Australia. After the season, the BoM noted that they found a separate circulation that was once considered a part of Tropical Low 34U. It developed on 25 April and tracked away to the east and dissipated the next day.

== Systems ==
=== Tropical Cyclone Paddy ===
- Category 1 tropical cyclone (Australian scale)
- Tropical storm (SSHWS)
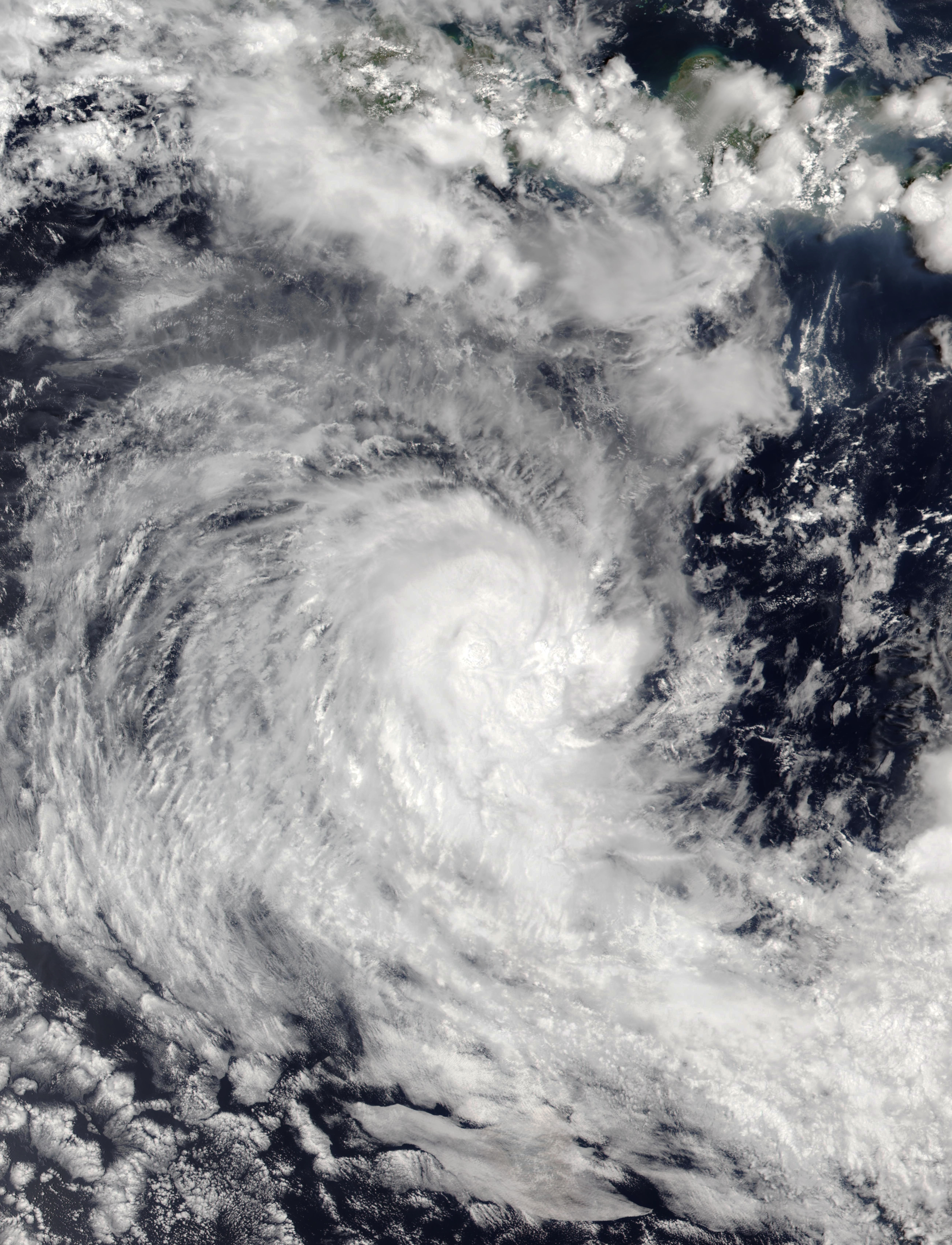
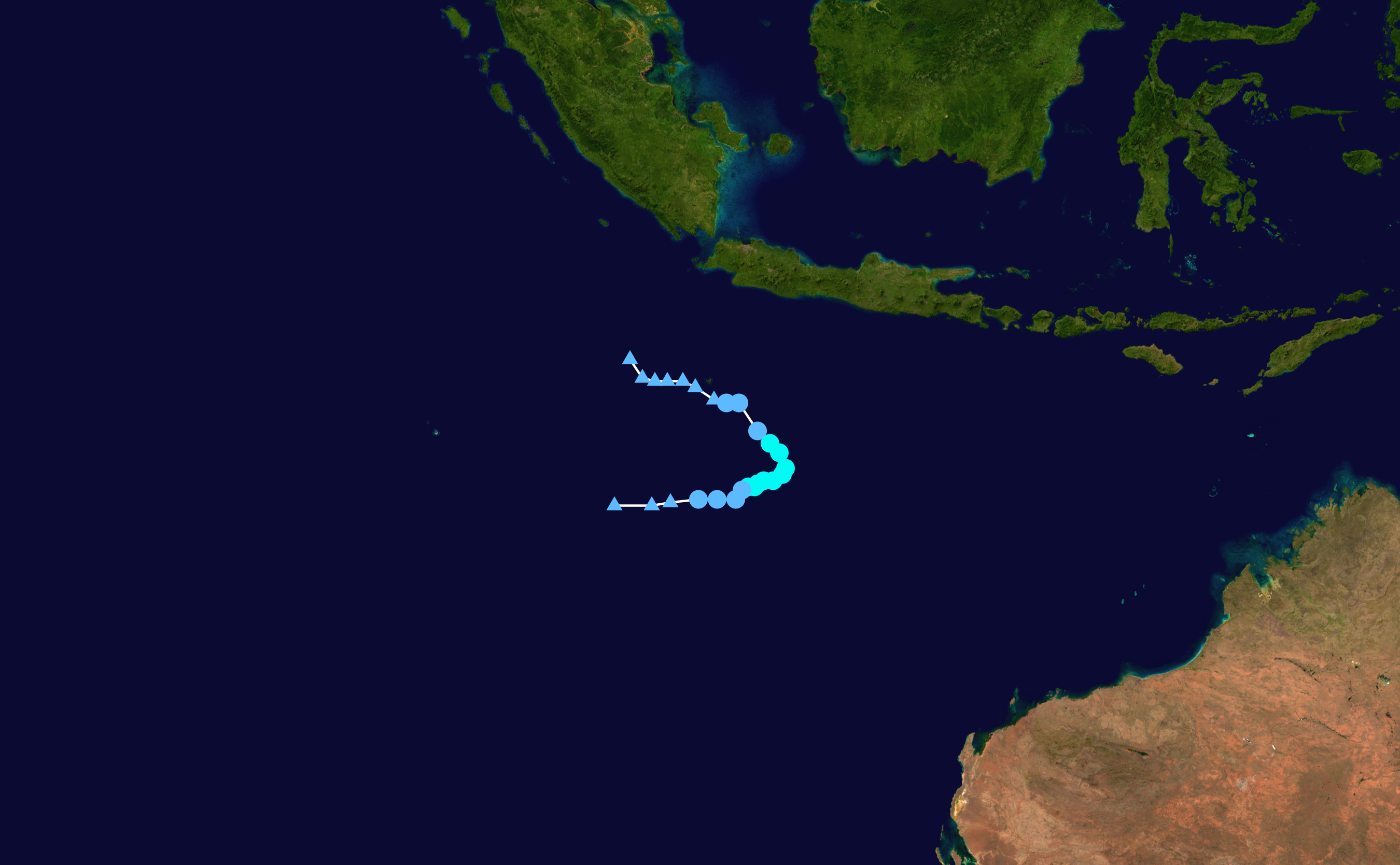
- Duration: 17 November – 23 November
- Peak intensity: 75 km/h (45 mph) (10-min); 994 hPa (mbar)

During 17 November, the Australian Bureau of Meteorology (BoM) reported that Tropical Low 02U had developed along a trough of low pressure, just to the west of Christmas Island. Over the next couple of days, the system remained slow-moving near the island before it started to move south-eastwards. On 21 November of 04:00 UTC, the Joint Typhoon Warning Center (JTWC) issued a Tropical Cyclone Formation Alert (TCFA) for Invest 90S which the agency was tracking very recently, noting that the system was well-structured, with convection and near gale-force winds wrapping into its consolidated low-level circulation center (LLCC). The BoM did not upgrade the system into a tropical cyclone at that time, as its centre was still somewhat elongated, and the near gale-force winds were only present at its southern quadrant. At 00:00 UTC of 22 November, the BoM upgraded the system to a Category 1 tropical cyclone on the Australian scale, and named it Paddy, becoming the first named cyclone in the season. The JTWC followed suit later that day at 09:00 UTC.

At this time, it started to incline more southwards under the influence of an upper trough moving to the east and a subtropical ridge to its south strengthening, with its pressure bottoming to 997 mbar (29.44 inHg). Paddy also reached its eventual peak intensity, with maximum 10-minute sustained winds of 40 kn (75 km/h; 45 mph), according to scatterometer passes. Sea surface temperatures around 28 °C (82 °F), low wind shear and favorable upper-level divergence were the factors behind Paddy's intensification. Paddy then reacted quickly to increasing northwesterly shear, as its convection began to decrease at 12:00 UTC that same day, and by early next day, the BoM reported that Paddy had become an ex-tropical cyclone. As it turned to the south-southwest as the ridge to its south strengthened further, the synoptic gradient between the two increased, letting the storm reintensify slightly that same day, though gale-force winds were not wrapping halfway of the system. The winds would later rapidly decrease, and by 24 November, the BoM discontinued monitoring Paddy. The JTWC subsequently followed suit and issued its final warning on the storm.

Paddy remained far from major landmasses throughout its existence; however, it brought prolonged rainfall to Christmas Island. During a five-day period from 17 to 21 November, the island saw 251.2 mm (9.89 in) of rain.

=== Tropical Low 03U ===
- Tropical low (Australian scale)
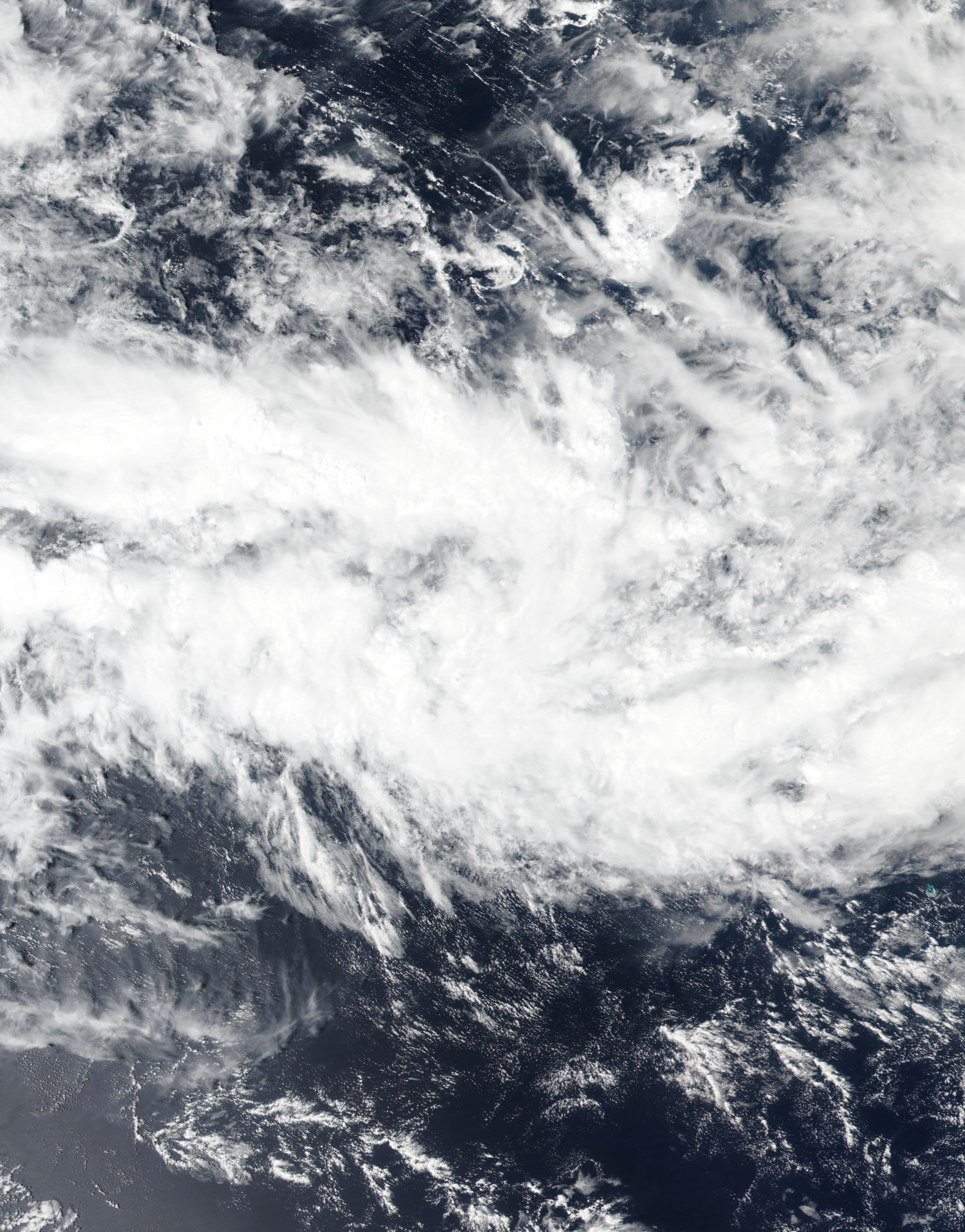
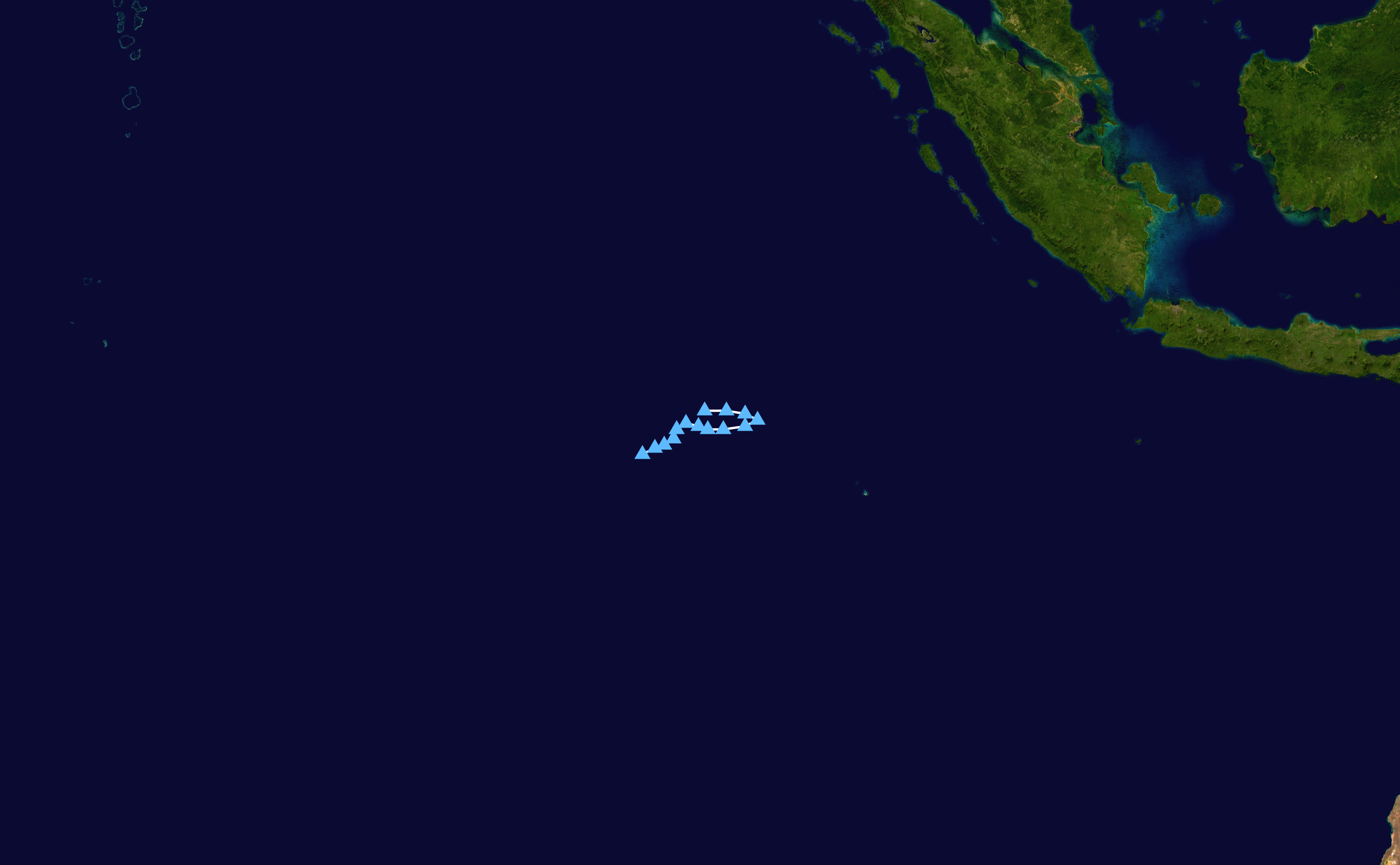
- Duration: 22 November – 28 November
- Peak intensity: Winds not specified; 1006 hPa (mbar)

On 22 November, a weak tropical low formed north of the Western Region, which was designated as 03U. By 24 November, the tropical low had entered the region and was located 560 kilometres (350 mi) west-northwest of the Cocos Islands. 03U meandered near the Cocos Islands, before moving westwards and exited the basin on 28 November.

=== Tropical Cyclone Teratai ===
- Category 1 tropical cyclone (Australian scale)
- Tropical storm (SSHWS)
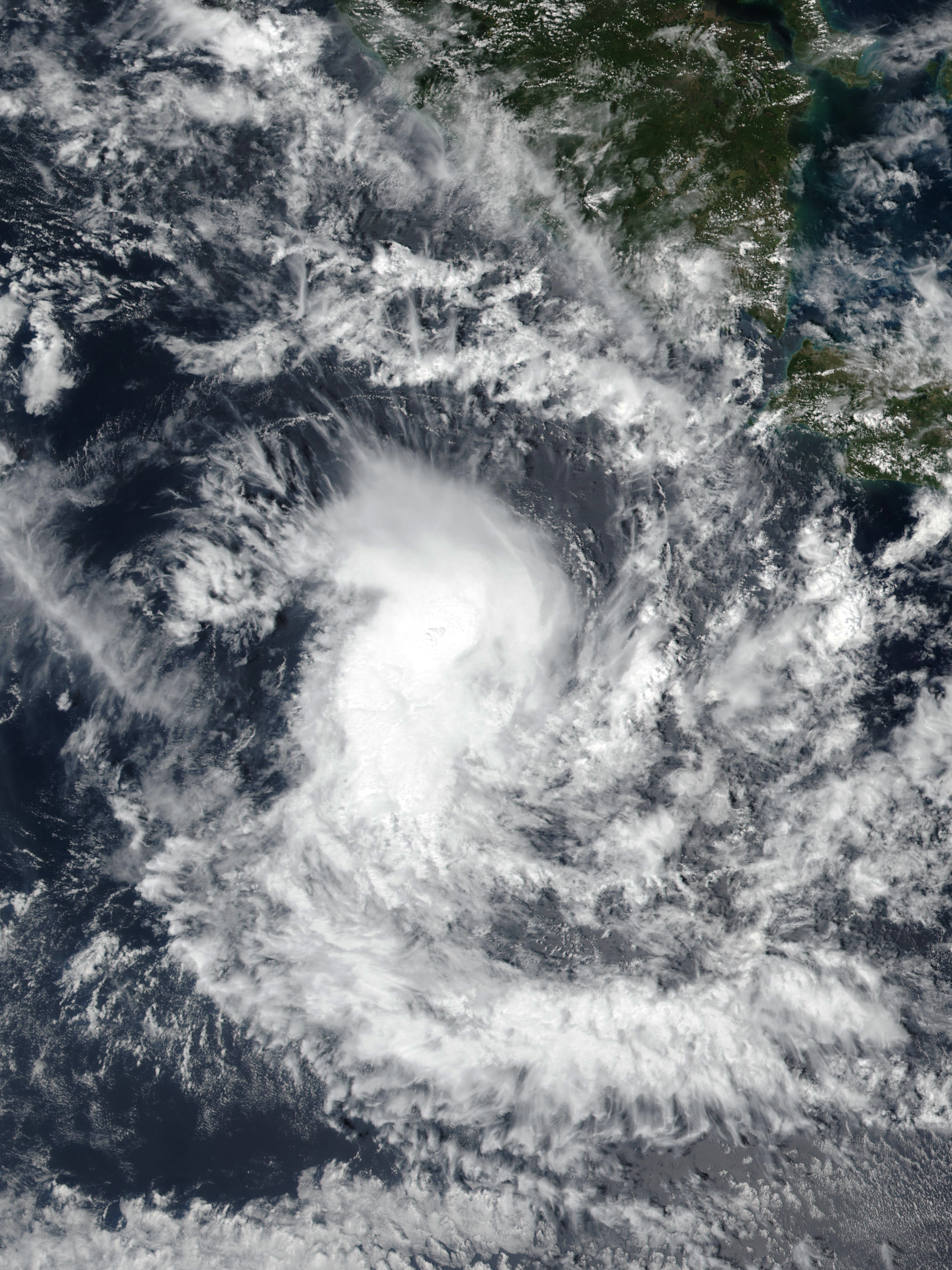
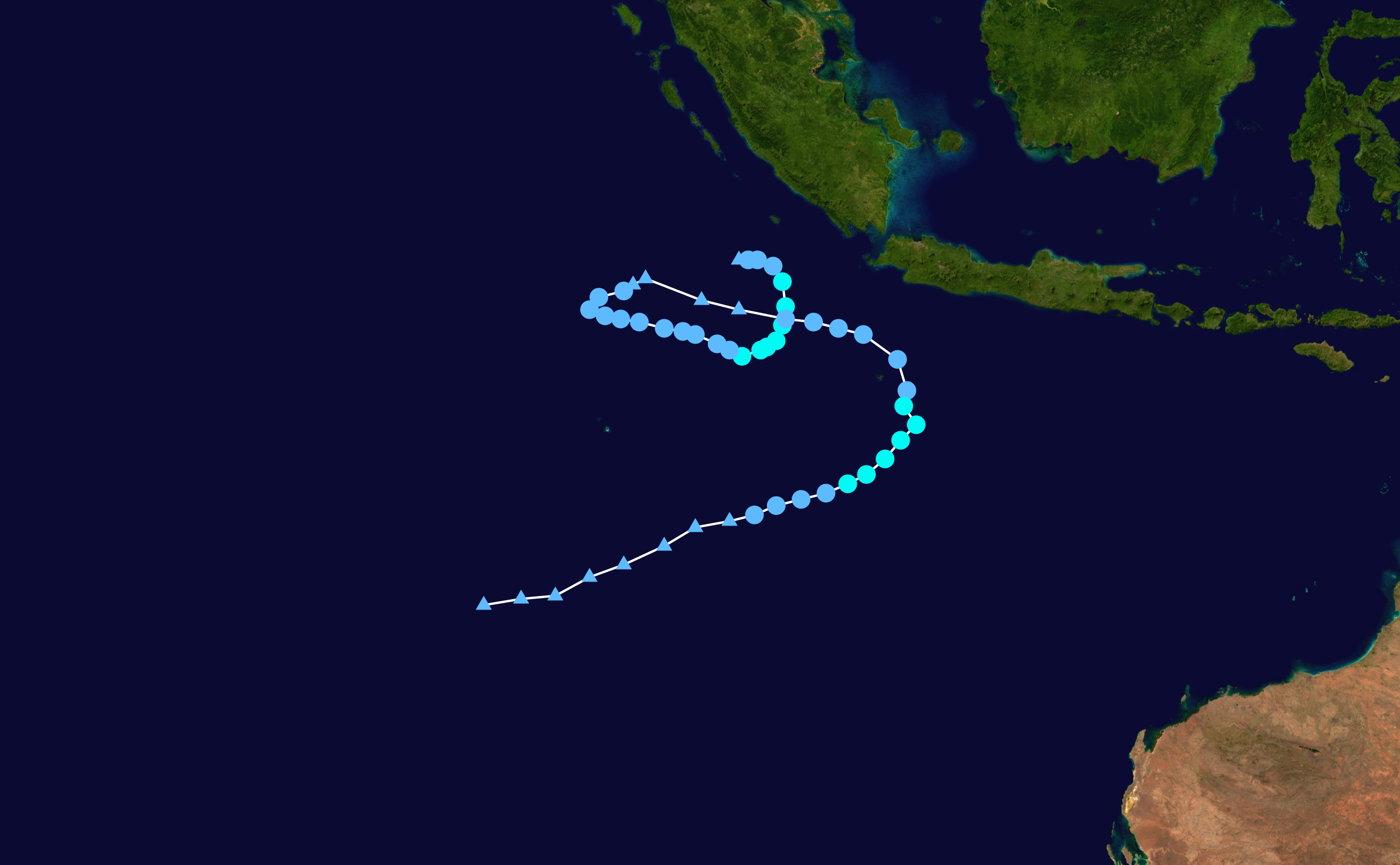
- Duration: 28 November – 11 December
- Peak intensity: 75 km/h (45 mph) (10-min); 996 hPa (mbar)

On 28 November, the BoM reported that a low formed within a monsoon trough to the southwest of Sumatra. They designated it as 05U by the next day. At 23:30 UTC on 30 November, the JTWC issued a TCFA for the system as the agencies found that the convection in associated with the system had increased. By the next day, the BoM briefly upgraded the system to a Category 1 tropical cyclone on the Australian scale, and TCWC Jakarta named it Teratai. Later, the JTWC upgraded Teratai to a tropical storm, as it briefly attained sufficient convection. But at 18:00 UTC, the BoM downgraded to a tropical low as deep convection had become limited, with the LLCC displaced towards the south. This was caused due to the lack of sufficient outflow caused by the northerly strait line flow which inhibited the system from further intensifying, despite favorable conditions. The JTWC followed suit two hours later. During the next few days, the BoM monitored ex-Teratai for redevelopment as the system executed a clockwise loop. By 6 December, the JTWC issued a TCFA, and the next day it re-upgraded the system to a tropical storm. However, by 09:00 UTC of 9 December, JTWC issued its final warning. The BoM continued to track the system until 11 December.

=== Tropical Cyclone Ruby ===
- Category 2 tropical cyclone (Australian scale)
- Category 1 tropical cyclone (SSHWS)
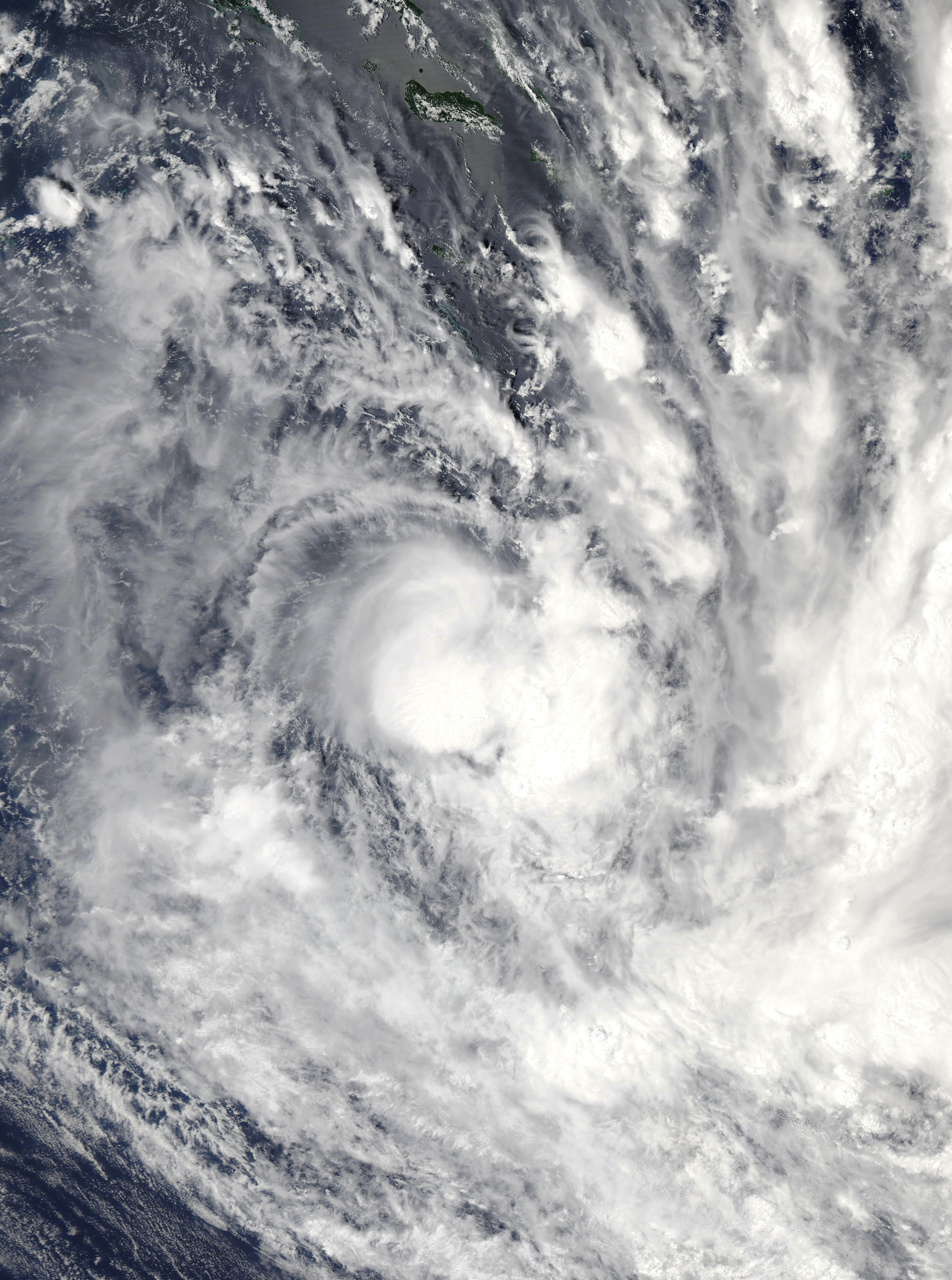
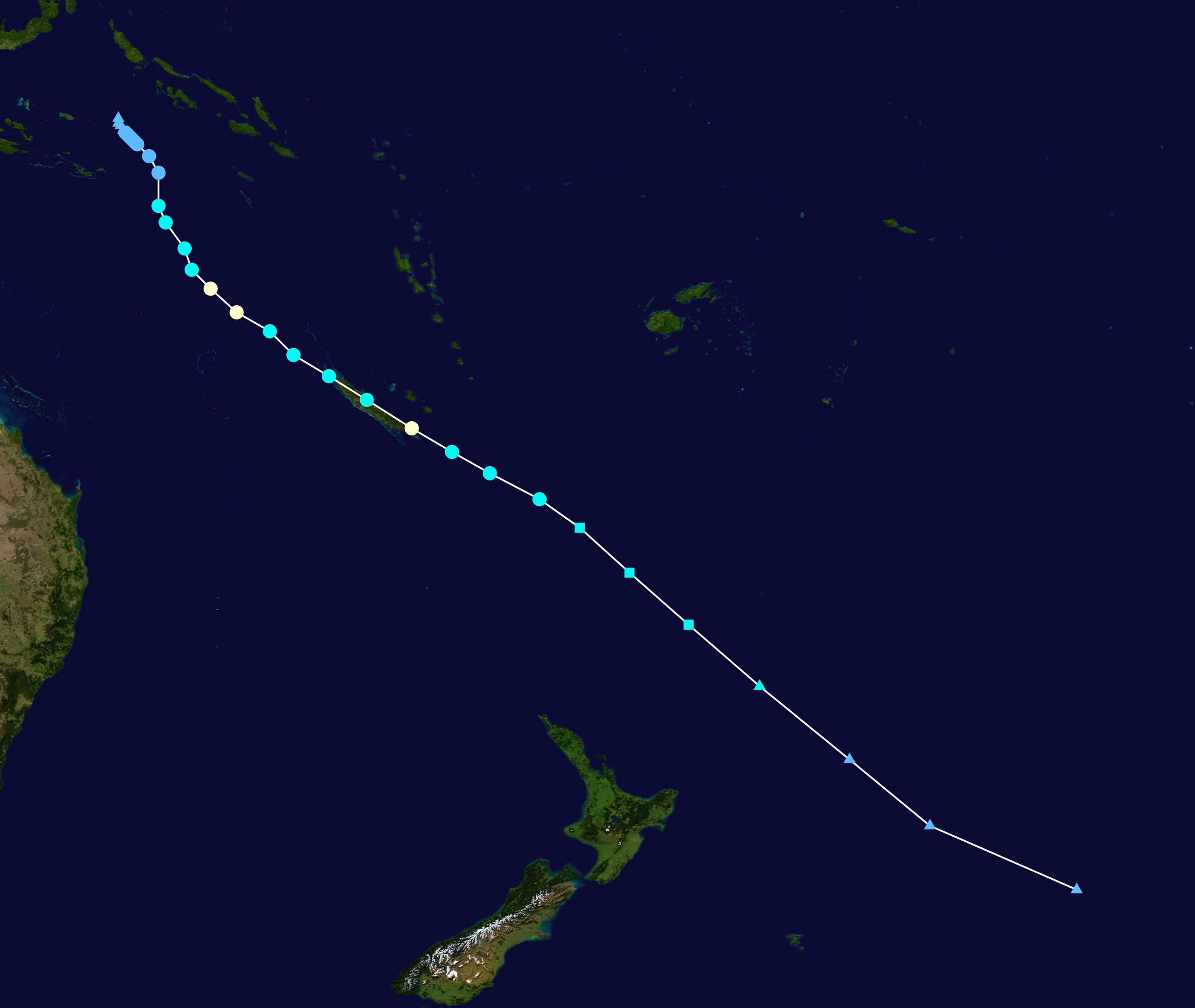
- Duration: 9 December – 13 December (Exited basin)
- Peak intensity: 110 km/h (70 mph) (10-min); 980 hPa (mbar)

On 6 December, the BoM predicted that a tropical low could form near the Solomon Sea. Two days later, the tropical low formed, resulting in the BoM designating it as 07U, while the JTWC issued a TCFA on the system. The system's deep convection became more organized overnight on 10 December, and began to strengthen, with gale-force winds being reported on 11 December. Late on the same day, the JTWC upgraded the system into a tropical storm. By the next day, it was upgraded to a Category 1 tropical cyclone on the Australian scale, resulting in the BoM naming it Ruby. Twelve hours later, the BoM would upgrade Ruby into a Category 2 cyclone, while the JTWC upgraded the system into a category 1-equivalent tropical cyclone. By 13 December, Ruby reached its peak intensity, before entering the South Pacific basin.

=== Tropical Low 06U ===
- Tropical low (Australian scale)
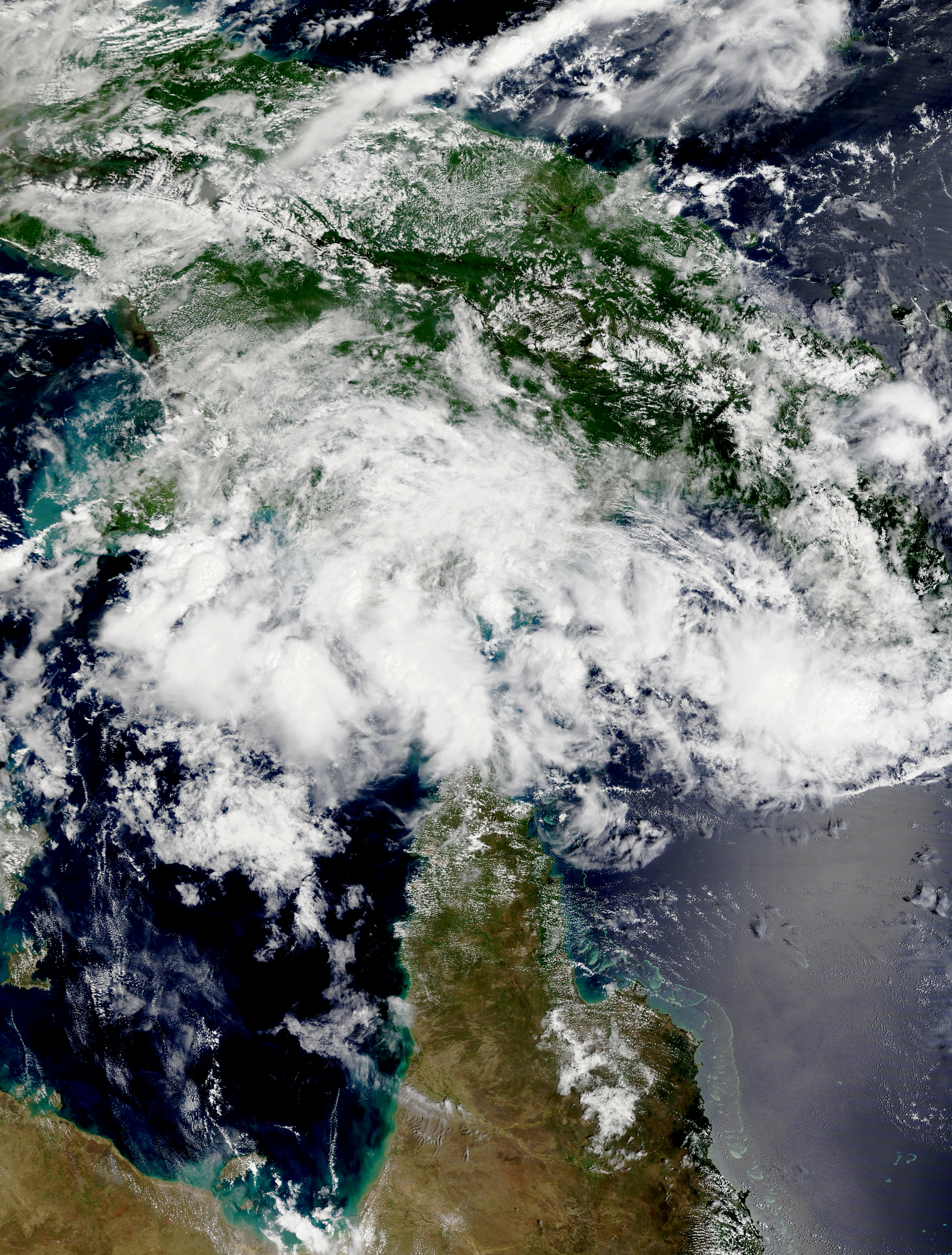
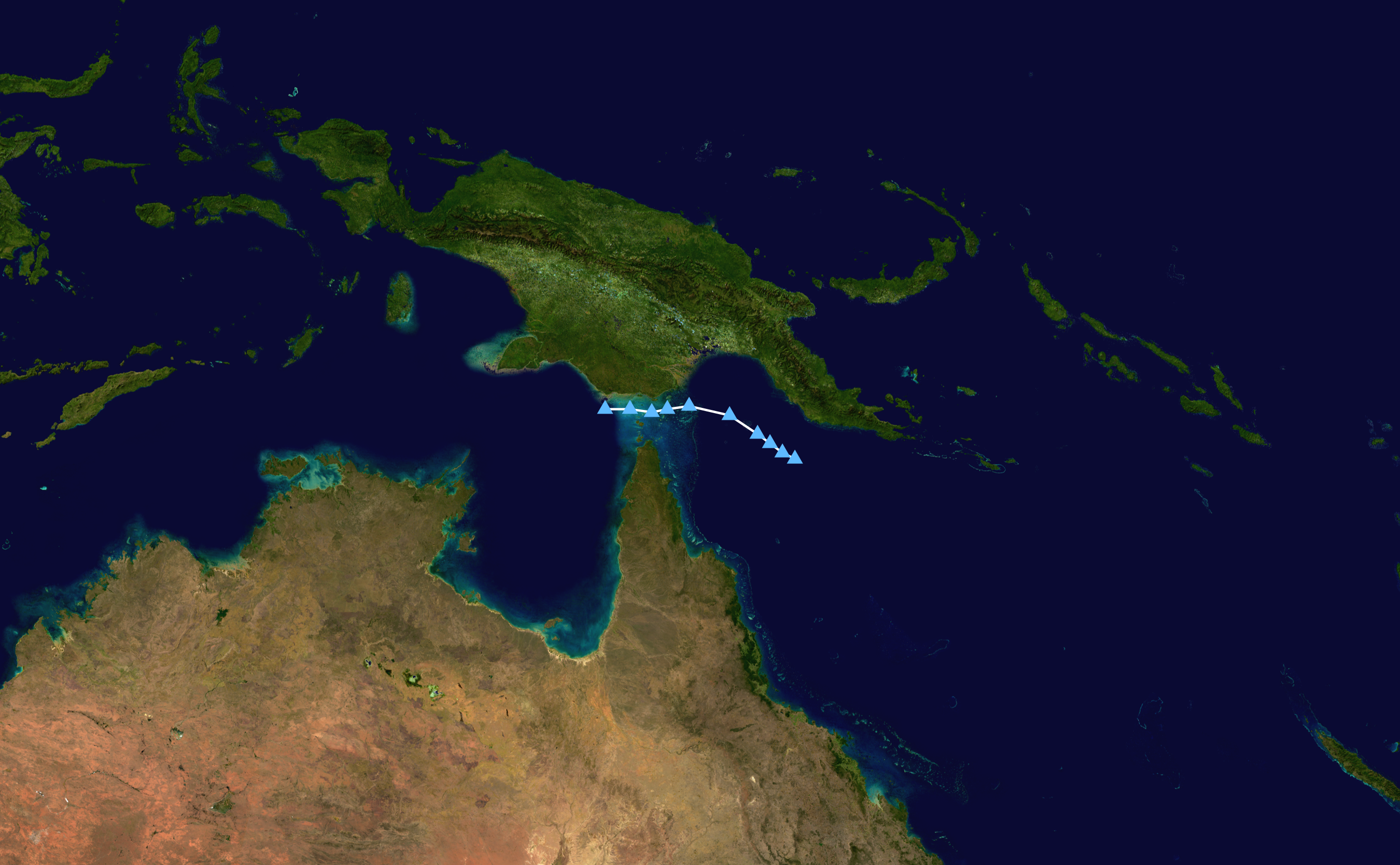
- Duration: 13 December – 15 December
- Peak intensity: Winds not specified; 1007 hPa (mbar)

On 7 December, the BoM noted on a possibility of a weak tropical low developing over the northern part of the Arafura Sea. The BoM designated the system as 06U. By 13 December, the BoM stated that 06U was already forming. The system was last noted on 15 December.

=== Tropical Cyclone Seth ===
- Category 2 tropical cyclone (Australian scale)
- Tropical storm (SSHWS)
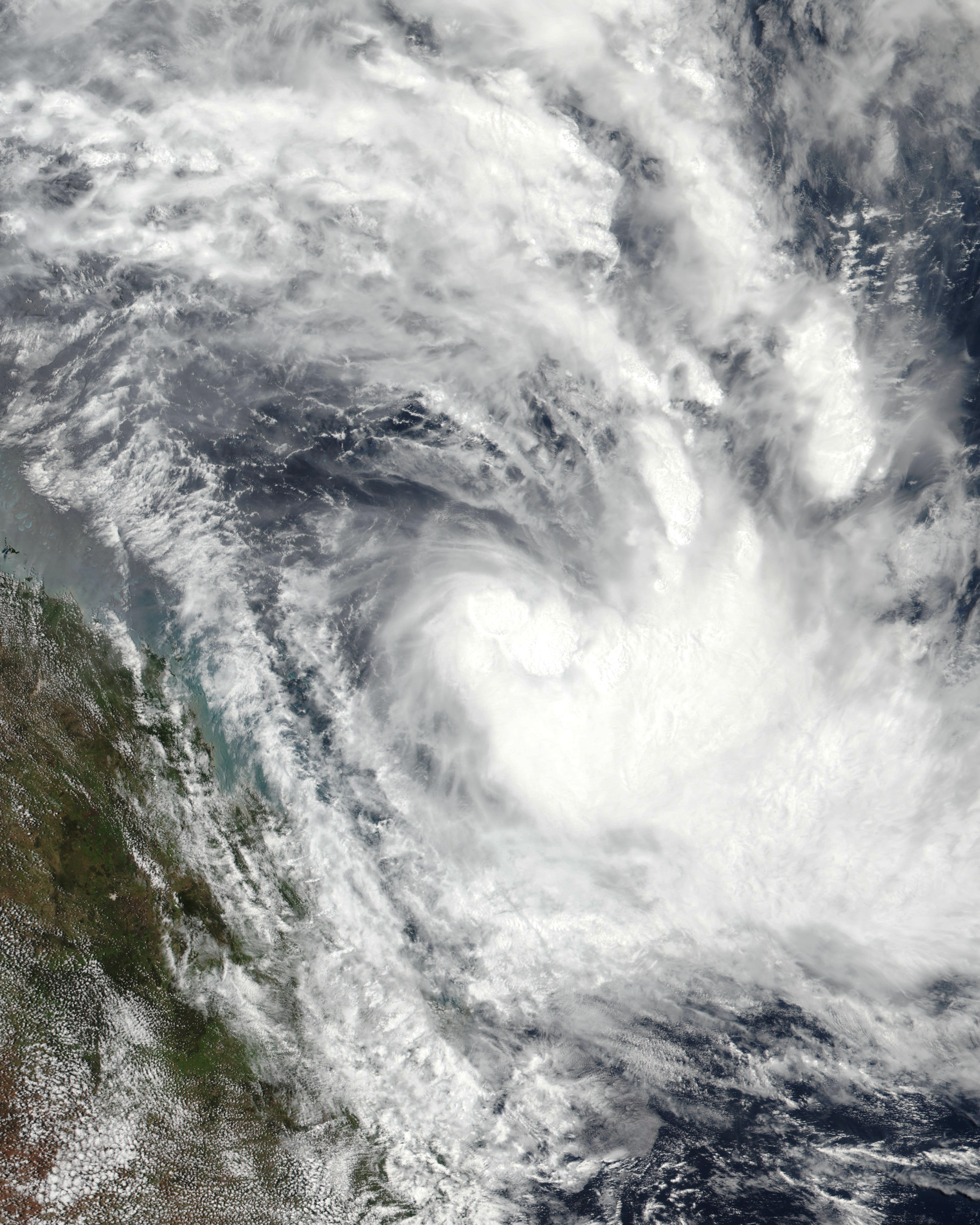
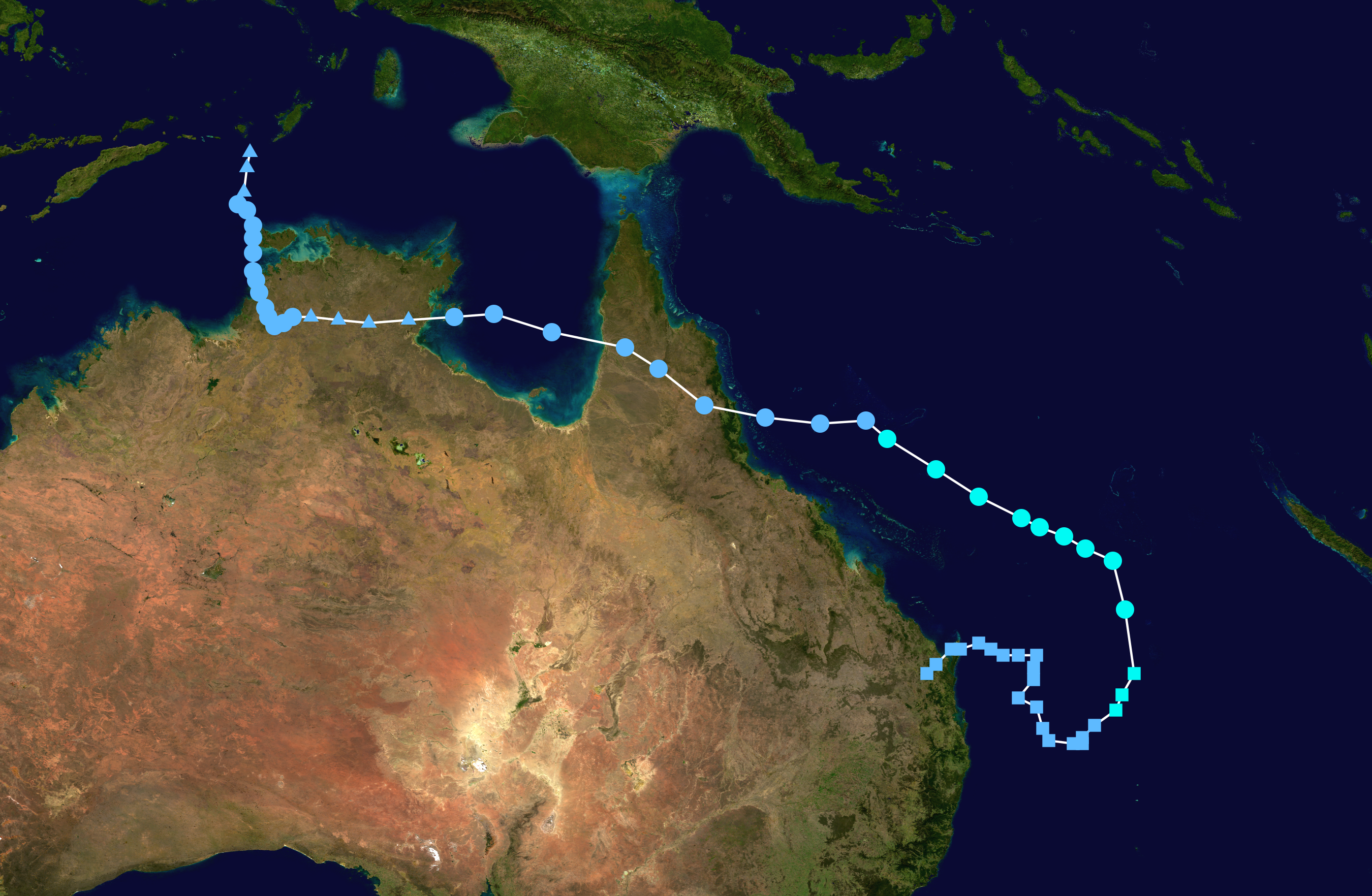
- Duration: 23 December – 1 January
- Peak intensity: 100 km/h (65 mph) (10-min); 982 hPa (mbar)

On 21 December, the BoM started to monitor a possible tropical low near the Arafura Sea. Two days later, the BoM designated the low as 08U. The JTWC started to monitor the system on 24 December. By that same day, BoM began issuing advisories on the system, predicting a Category 1 intensity before landfall, while the JTWC issued a TCFA at 21:00 UTC on the same day. However, the TCFA was cancelled at 18:00 UTC on 25 December, since the system moved inland, and the BoM ceased issuing advisories as well. However, the tropical low kept moving eastward, reaching the Gulf of Carpentaria, before moving over the Top End and entering the Coral Sea. At 02:30 UTC on 30 December, the JTWC issued a TCFA again on the system; however, at 02:30 UTC on 31 December, the TCFA was cancelled, due to the system developing subtropical characteristics. Around that same time, the BoM upgraded the low to a Category 1 tropical cyclone on the Australian scale and named it Seth. At 15:00 UTC, the JTWC finally classified it as a tropical cyclone, designating the system with the identifier 04P. The cyclone reached its peak intensity that day, with BoM estimating Seth as a category 2 tropical cyclone, with sustained winds of 110 km/h (70 mph), before subsequently downgrading the storm to a category 1 tropical cyclone at 18:00 UTC that same day. At 06:00 UTC on 1 January, the BoM reclassified Seth as an ex-tropical cyclone. The JTWC issued their final warning three hours later. On the next day, the BoM classified the system as a subtropical low.

As a post-tropical cyclone, Seth killed 2 people; one in Queensland and the other in New South Wales.

=== Tropical Cyclone Tiffany ===
- Category 2 tropical cyclone (Australian scale)
- Tropical storm (SSHWS)
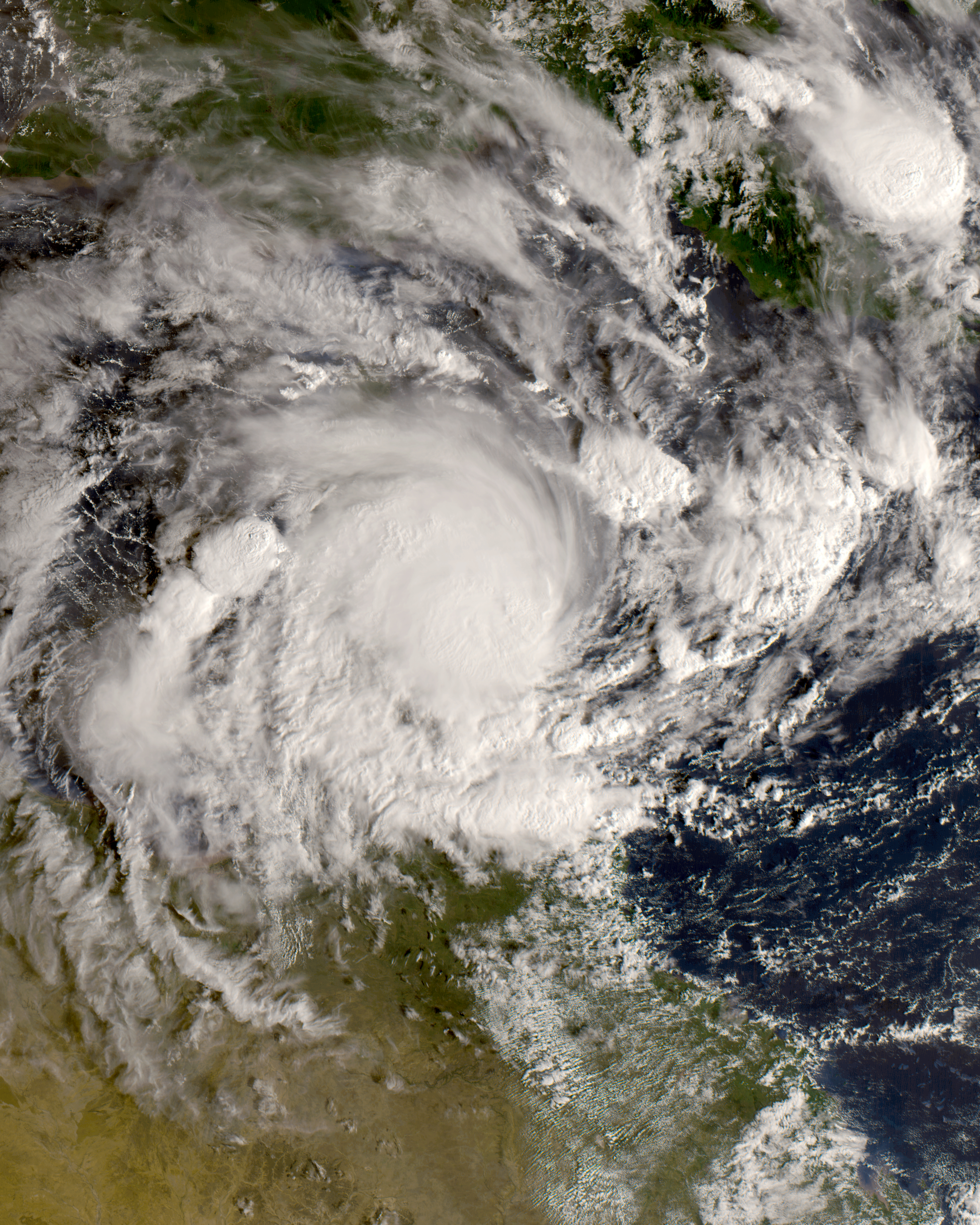
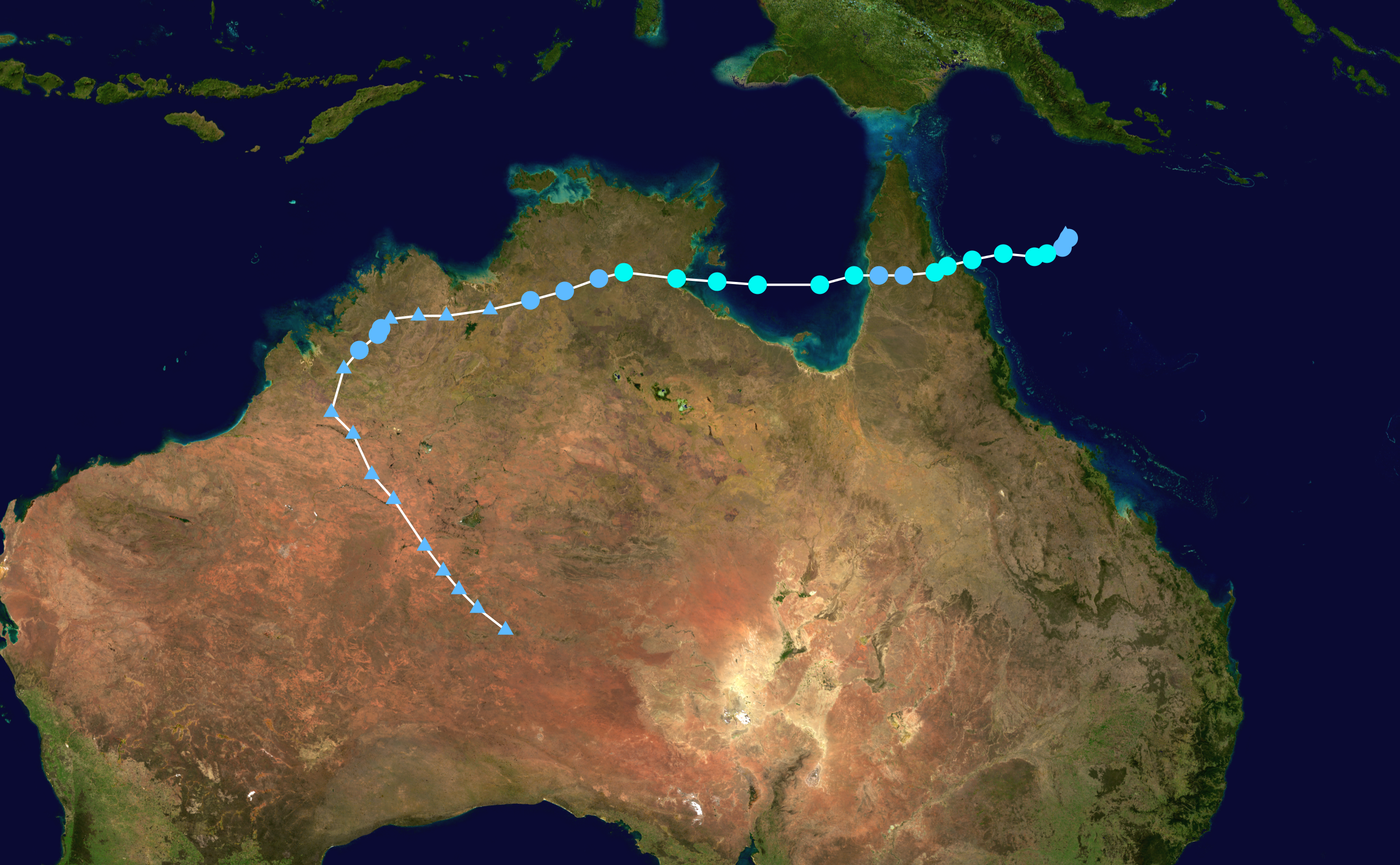
- Duration: 8 January – 12 January
- Peak intensity: 100 km/h (65 mph) (10-min); 988 hPa (mbar)

On 4 January, the BoM started to monitor a possible tropical low near the Coral Sea. By 8 January, BoM began issuing advisories on Tropical Low 10U. The JTWC later issued a TCFA on the system. By the next day, the BoM upgraded it to a category 1 tropical cyclone, and named it Tiffany. The JTWC subsequently followed suit and started issuing advisories on Tiffany. Tiffany then rapidly intensified, peaking as a Category 2 tropical cyclone in the Australian scale and a Category 1-equivalent tropical cyclone in the Saffir-Simpson scale. The storm then rapidly weakened and made landfall over the Cape York Peninsula as a category 1 tropical cyclone at 06:00 UTC on 10 January. Due to land interaction, it rapidly weakened overland and became a weak tropical low. The low entered into the Gulf of Carpentaria with that intensity by the same night. Despite the moderate wind shear, Tiffany re-intensified, with the BoM upgrading the system into a category 2 tropical cyclone by 11 January. On 00:00 UTC of 12 January, the storm made its final landfall over the Northern Territory region and was followed by rapid weakening. The JTWC stopped issuing advisories by the same time.

Tiffany brought gusty winds and heavy rainfall exceeding 100 mm (3.9 in) to the Top End. A house near Katherine suffered around A$50,000 (US$36,000) in damage from fallen trees.

=== Tropical Low 11U ===
- Tropical low (Australian scale)
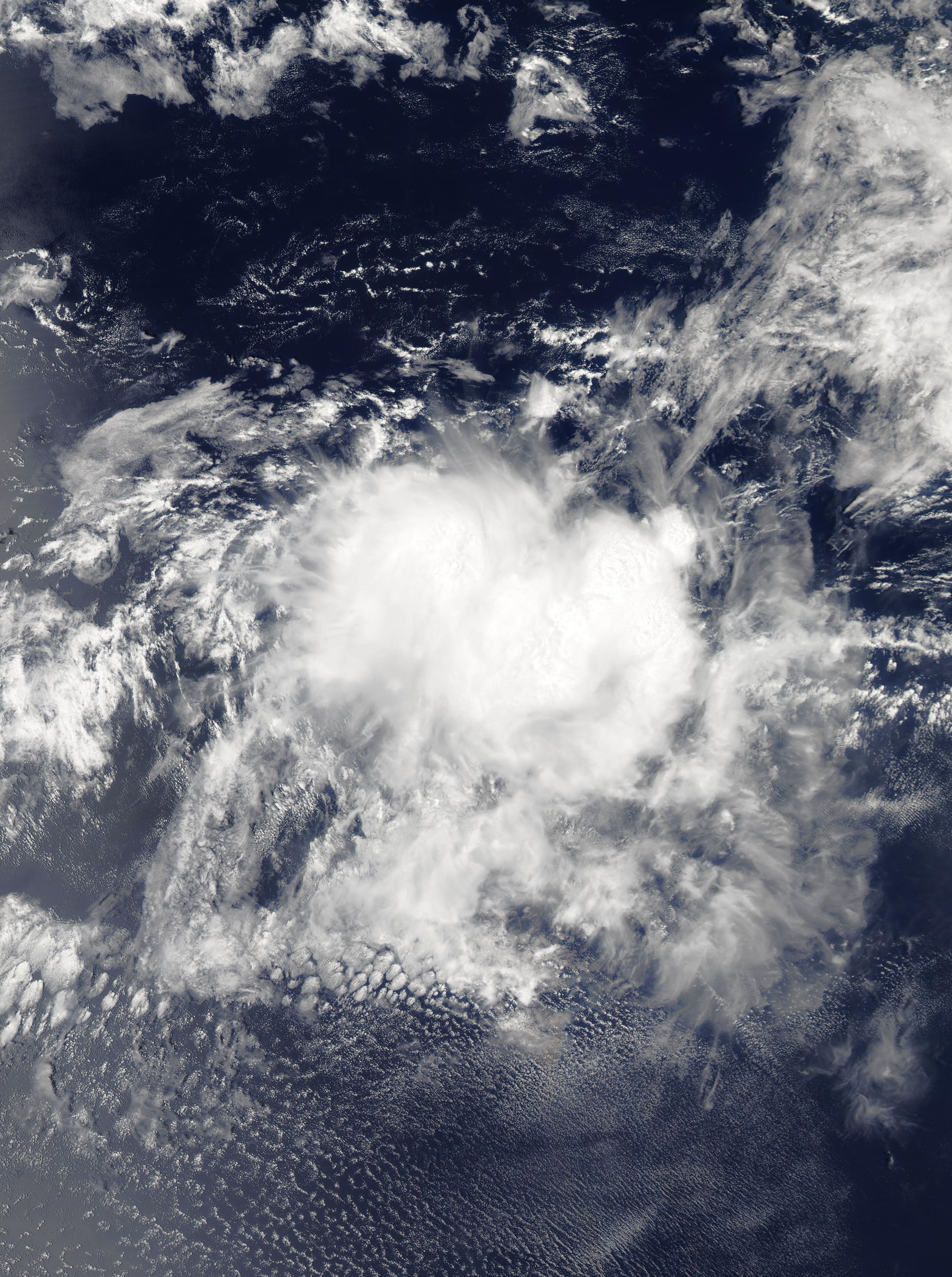
- Duration: 13 January – 14 January
- Peak intensity: Winds not specified; 1008 hPa (mbar)

On 6 January, the BoM first noted the possible formation of a weak tropical low. By 13 January, 11U formed while moving west-southwestward, 11U dissipated by the next day.

=== Tropical Low 14U ===
- Tropical low (Australian scale)
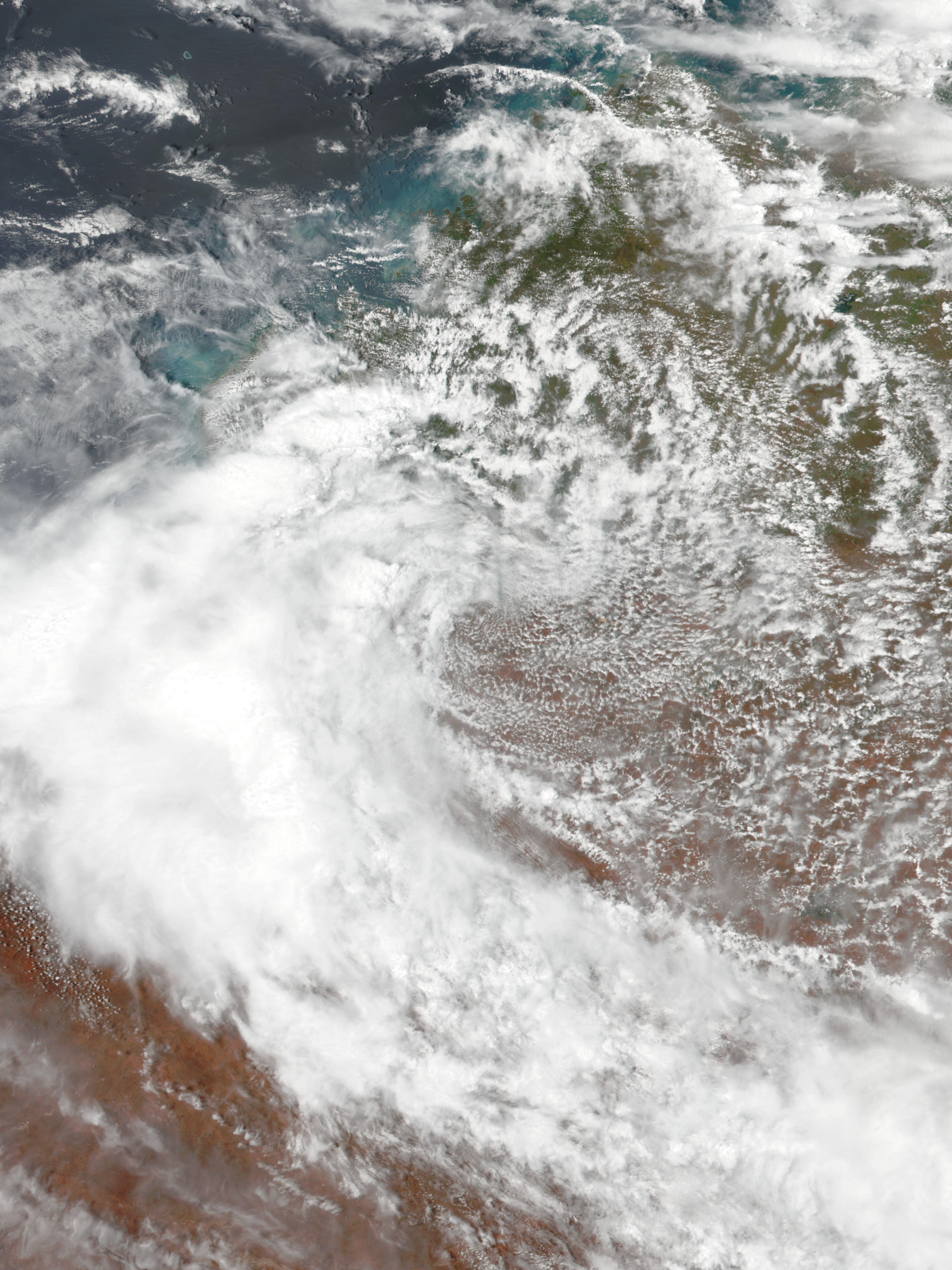
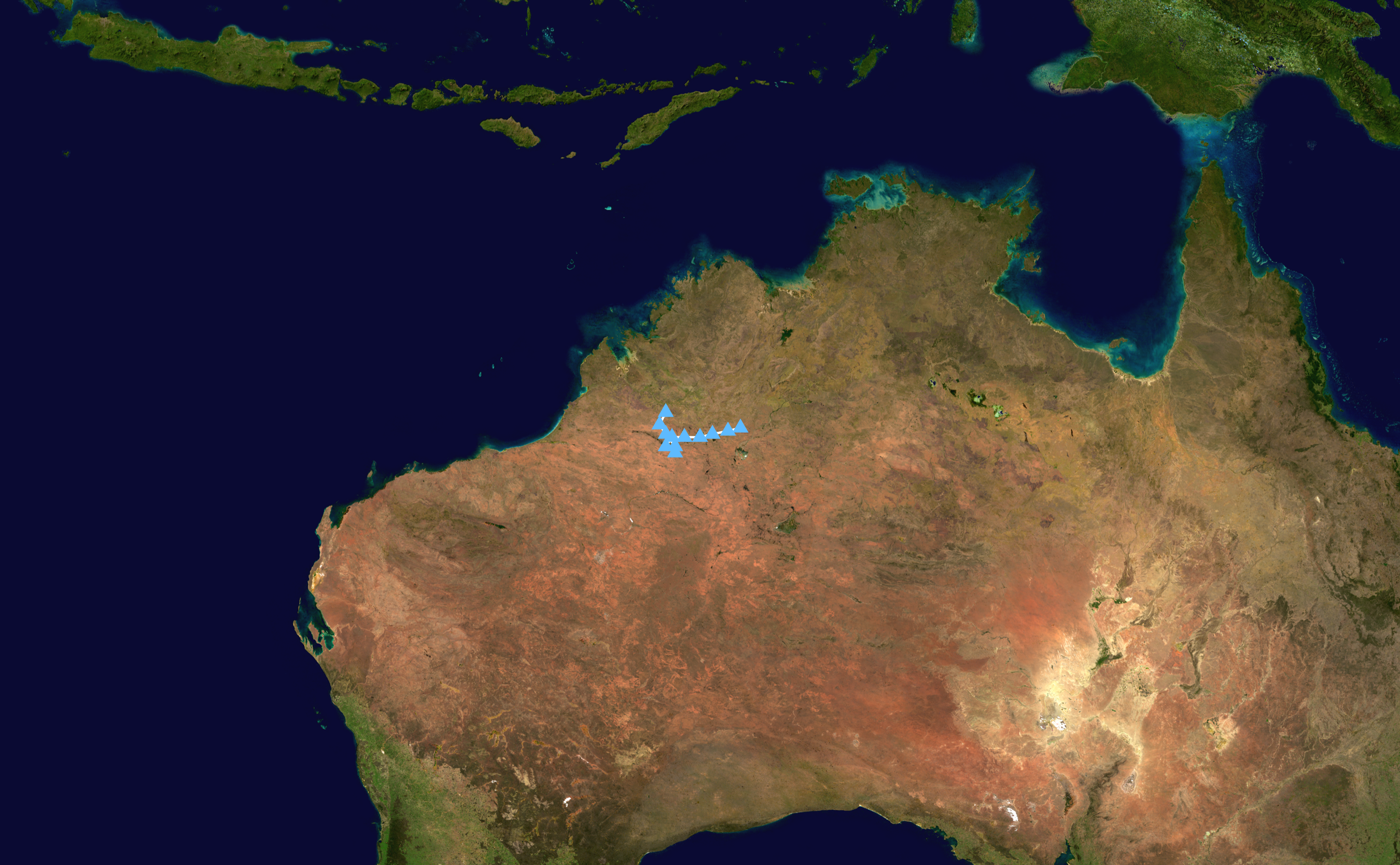
- Duration: 28 January – 5 February
- Peak intensity: Winds not specified; 1003 hPa (mbar)

On 26 January, the BoM noted that a tropical low may form within a monsoon trough over the Kimberley Region. The agency then reported that the low was forming over the central parts of the Northern Territory on 28 January. As it moved slowly west over the next few days, by 1 February, the BoM designated the tropical low as 14U. The low then weakened as it turned northwestwards, before being last noted on 5 February, about 515 km (320 mi) north-northwest of Port Hedland.

In Western Australia, prolific rains affected the Kimberley with some areas recording accumulations not seen in over a century. Country Downs measured 843 mm (33.2 in) by 2 February, including 652.2 mm (25.68 in) in a 24-hour span. The latter constituted the second-highest daily rainfall on record in the state. Flooding occurred along the Fitzroy River, covering roads, washing out topsoil, knocking down fences, and toppling trees. More than 80,000 lightning strikes were observed around Broome. Rainfall in the city reached 352.8 mm (13.89 in) on 30 January, surpassing the total rainfall seeing during the entirety of 2021.

=== Tropical Low 16U ===
- Tropical low (Australian scale)
- Tropical storm (SSHWS)
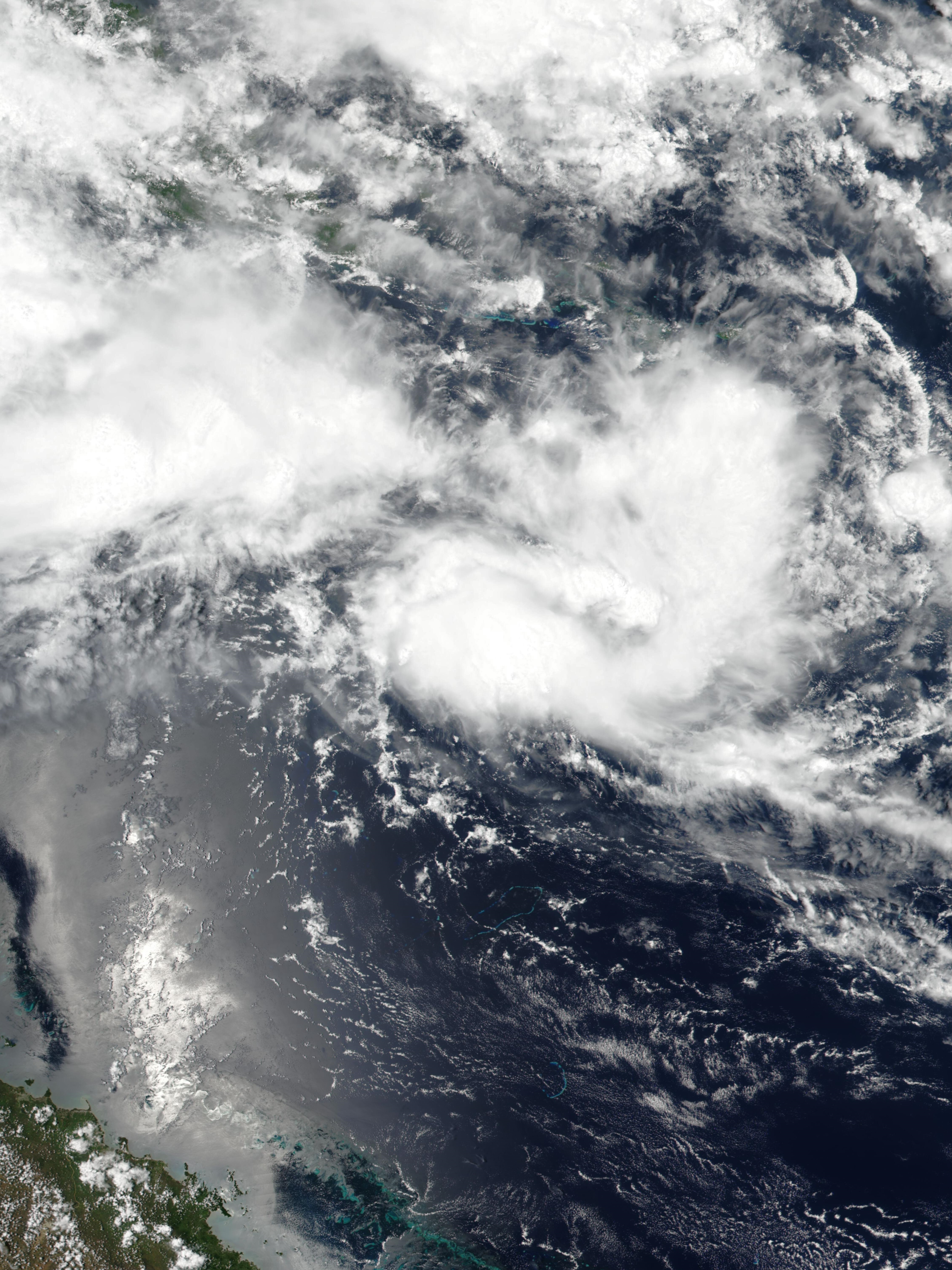
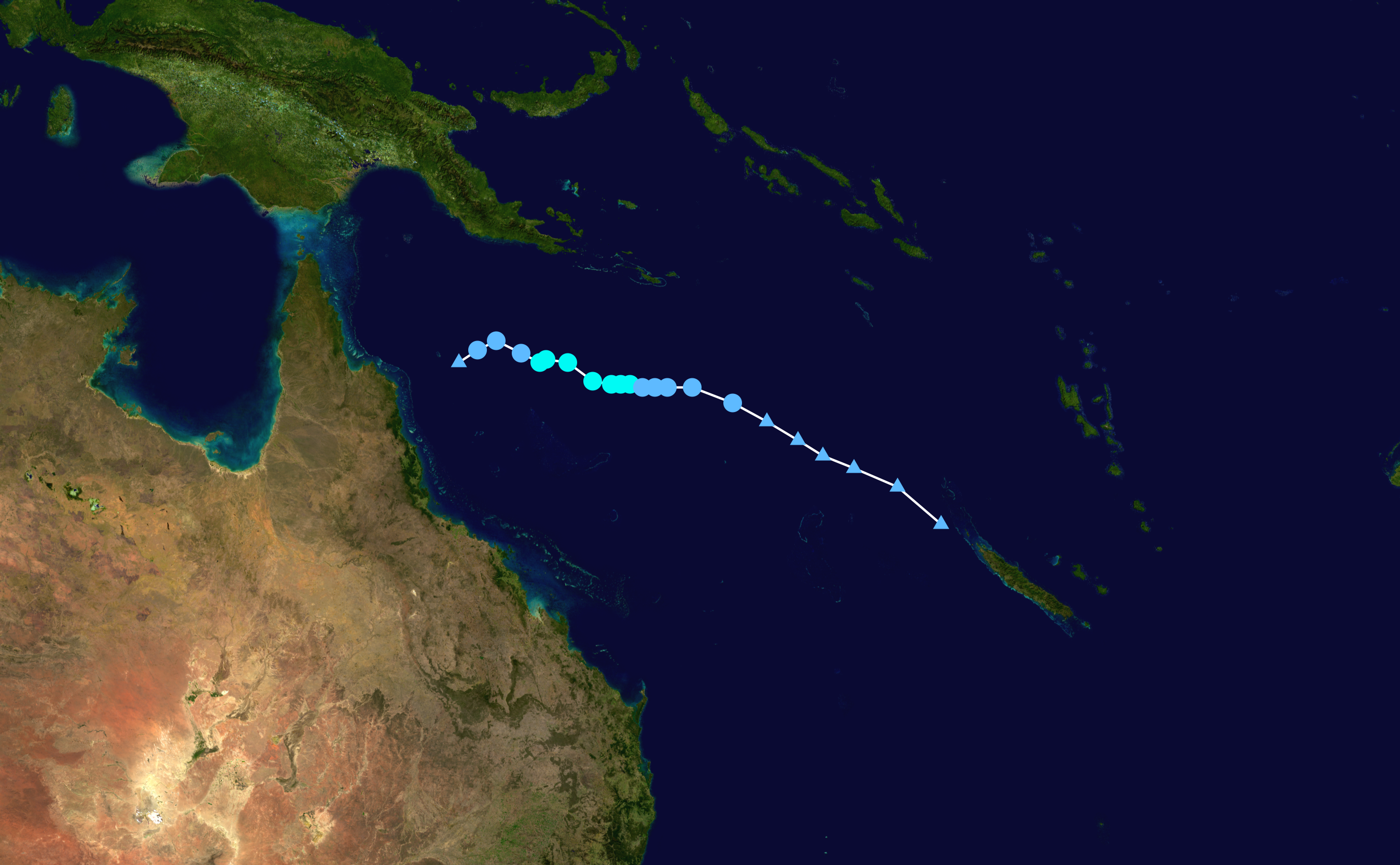
- Duration: 29 January – 3 February (Exited basin)
- Peak intensity: 65 km/h (40 mph) (10-min); 995 hPa (mbar)

On 28 January, the BoM noted that a tropical low may form within a monsoon trough over the Coral Sea over the next few days. By the next day, the agency reported that the low was forming about 250 km (160 mi) to the northeast of Cairns. On 30 January, the JTWC started to monitor the low and gave it a low chance of formation into a tropical cyclone. Under a favorable environment of warm sea surface temperatures, lowering wind shear and good outflow aloft, the system continued to consolidate, prompting the JTWC to issue a TCFA by the next day, before subsequently upgrading it to a tropical cyclone, and designated it as 09P. By 1 February, the BoM designated the low as 16U. However, 16U did not intensify further as a dry air entrainment hampered the system's intensification, while continuing to move east-southeast under a near-equatorial ridge positioned to the north and northeast. The JTWC later downgraded 16U into a tropical depression. On 3 February, 16U exited the basin and entered the South Pacific basin.

=== Tropical Low 17U ===
- Tropical low (Australian scale)
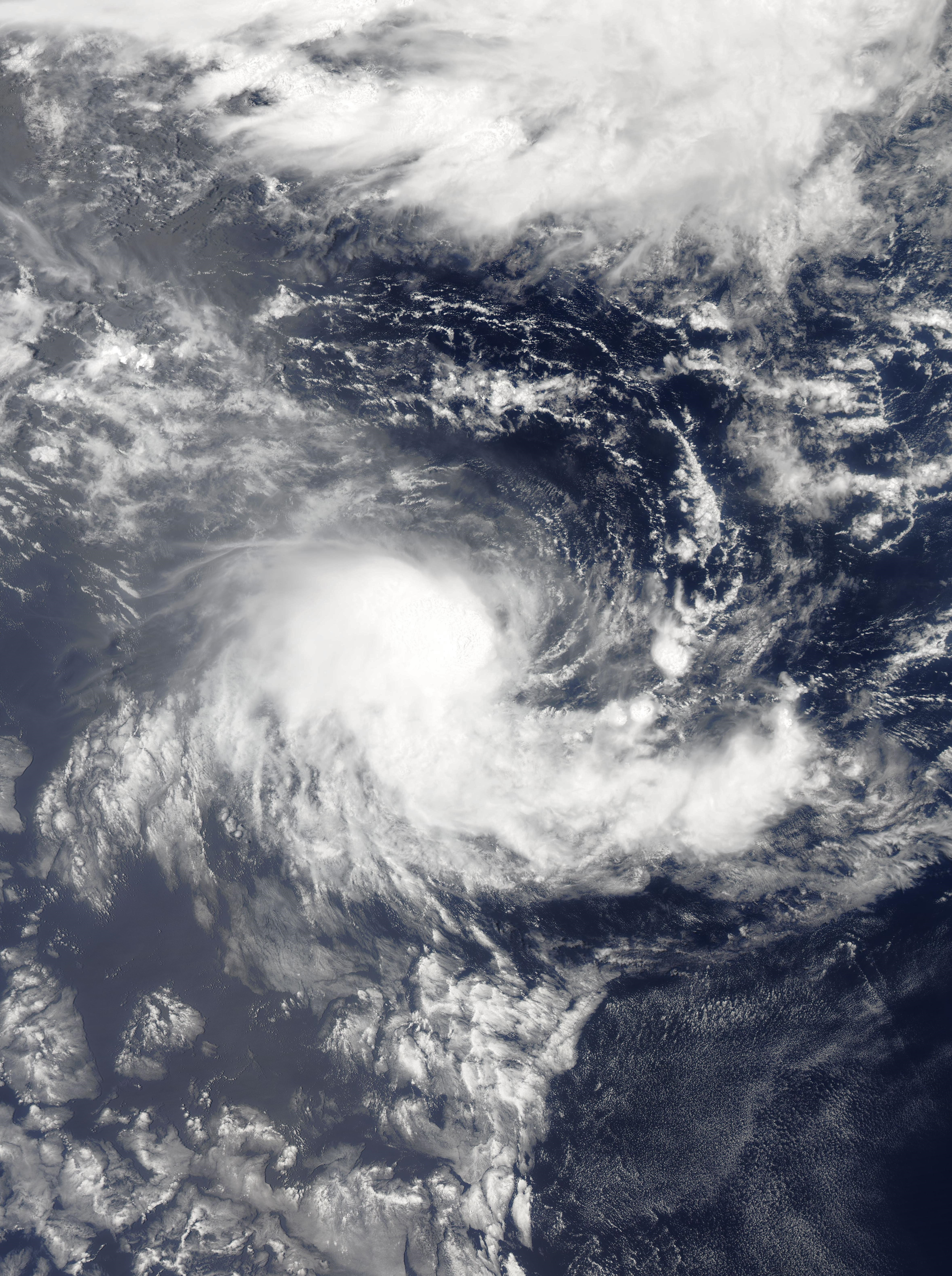
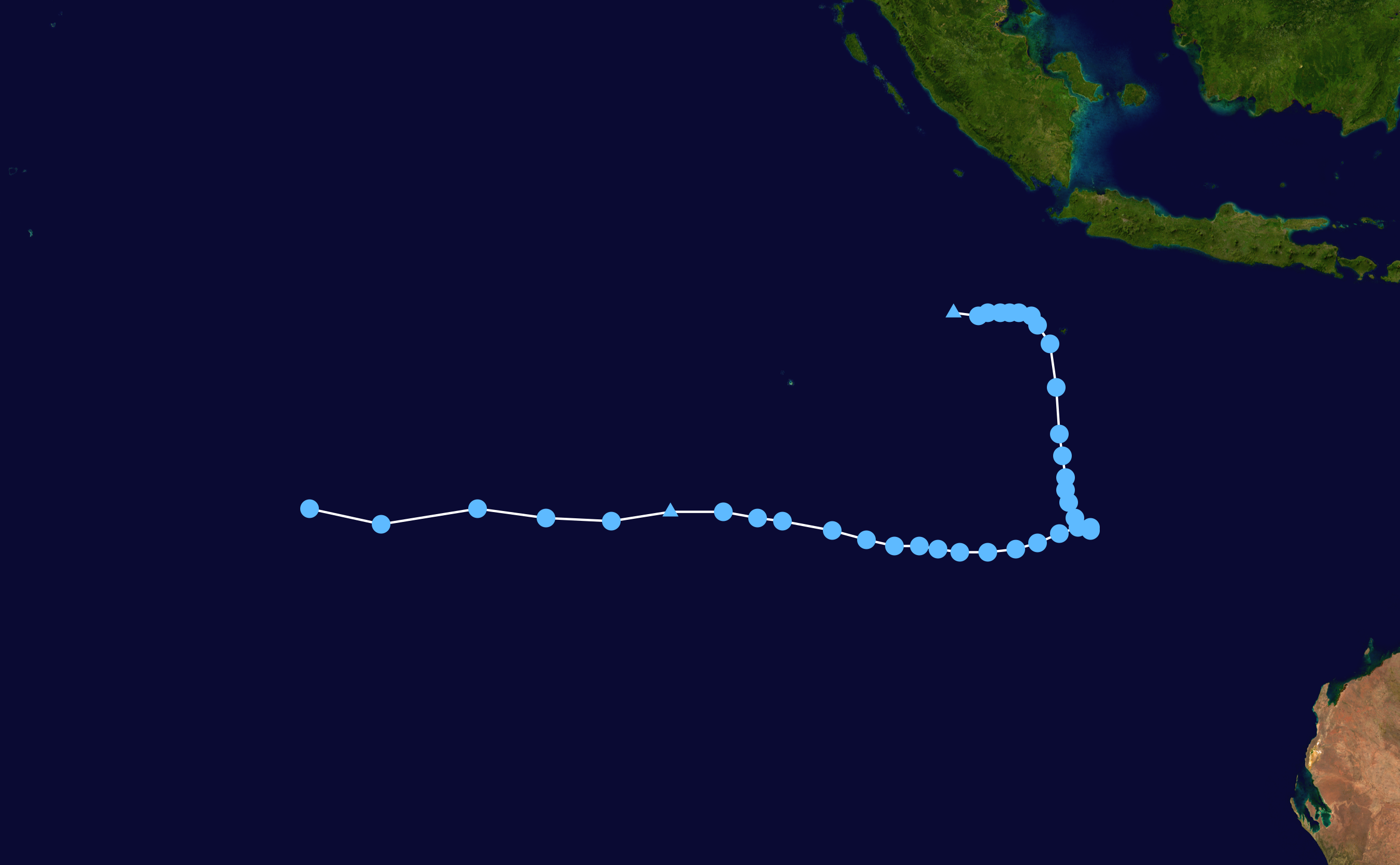
- Duration: 5 February – 14 February
- Peak intensity: Winds not specified; 1001 hPa (mbar)

By 4 February, the BoM noted that a weak tropical low may form within the vicinity of Christmas Island, and predesignated it as 17U. The low then subsequently formed by the next day, about 300 km (190 mi) west-southwest of Christmas Island. By 7 February, the JTWC started to monitor 17U, and gave it a medium chance for development within the next 24 hours. The BoM subsequently gave the system a low chance for development in the next 3 days. Under an environment of warm sea surface temperatures, lowering vertical wind shear and fair poleward outflow, the low started to organize, with deep convection wrapping to its low-level circulation center, prompting the JTWC to issue a TCFA by the next day. However, as it moved south-southwest, the wind shear started to increase, leading to its LLCC becoming exposed and the JTWC cancelling the TCFA on 10 February. 17U continued westwards, and was last noted by the BoM on 13 February, before exiting the basin shortly thereafter.

=== Tropical Low 19U (Fezile) ===
- Tropical low (Australian scale)
- Monsoon depression
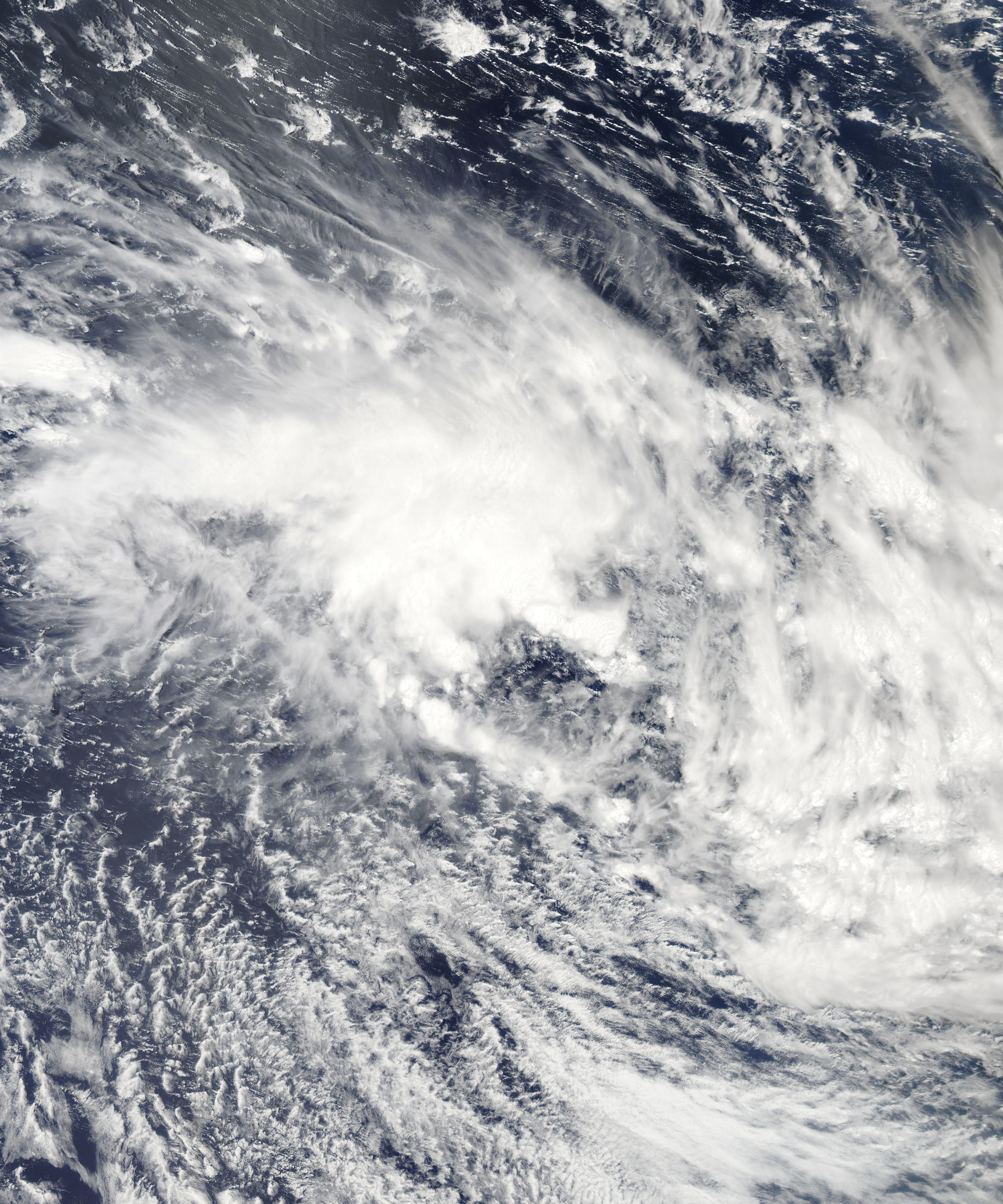
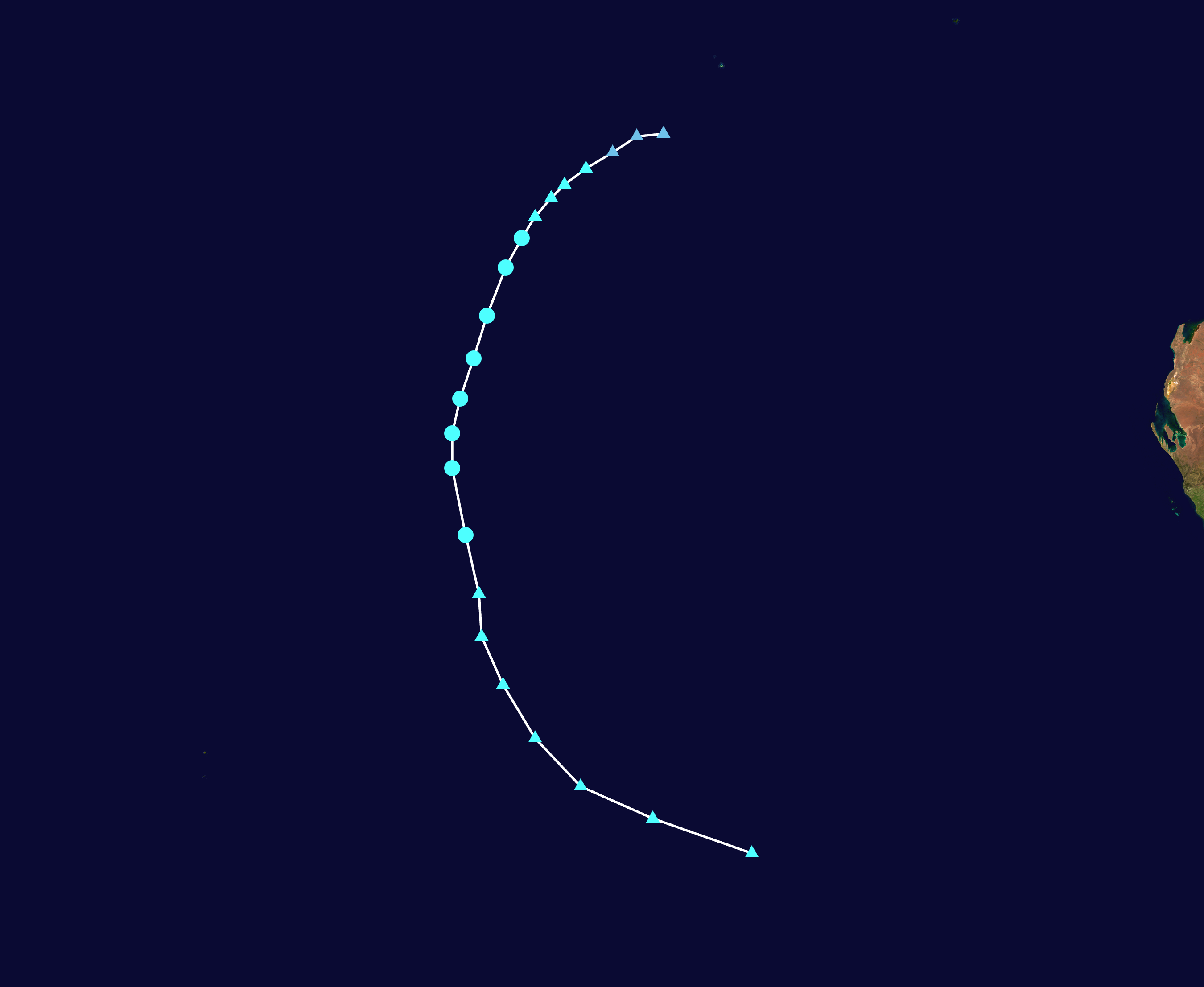
- Duration: 13 February – 16 February (Exited basin)
- Peak intensity: 55 km/h (35 mph) (1-min); 999 hPa (mbar)

On 10 February, the BoM noted that a tropical low may form in the next few days to the southeast of Christmas Island, and was predesignated as 19U. The tropical low then developed three days later, about 600 km (370 mi) southeast of the Cocos Islands. 19U moved west-southwestwards, before entering the South-West Indian Ocean basin on 16 February.

=== Tropical Low 20U ===
- Tropical low (Australian scale)
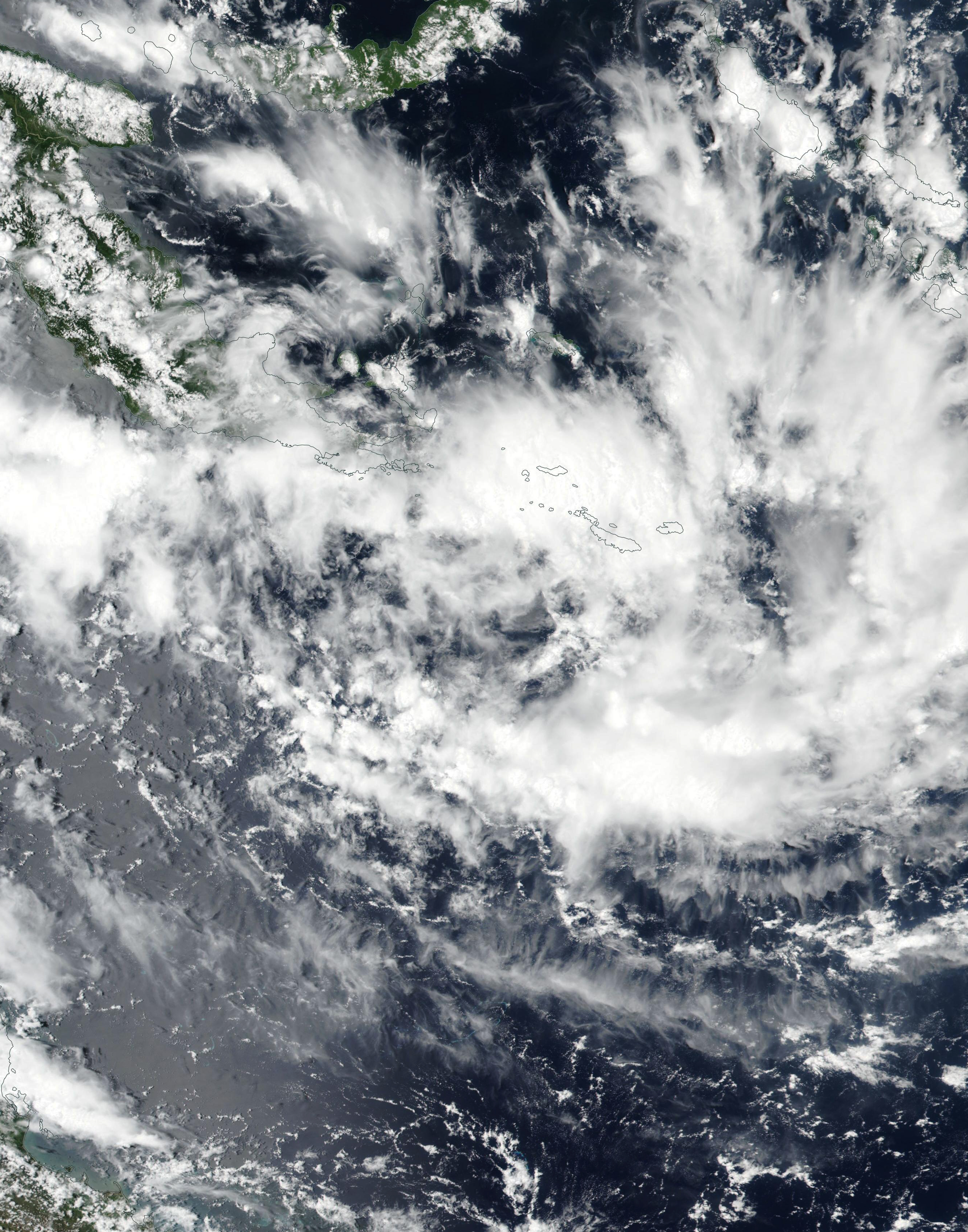
- Duration: 17 February – 18 February
- Peak intensity: Winds not specified; 1003 hPa (mbar)

On 16 February, the BoM noted that a weak tropical low may form to the south of Papua New Guinea, and predesignated it as 20U. The low then subsequently formed the next day, under an unfavorable environment. 20U was last noted by 18 February.

=== Severe Tropical Cyclone Vernon ===
- Category 4 severe tropical cyclone (Australian scale)
- Category 4 tropical cyclone (SSHWS)
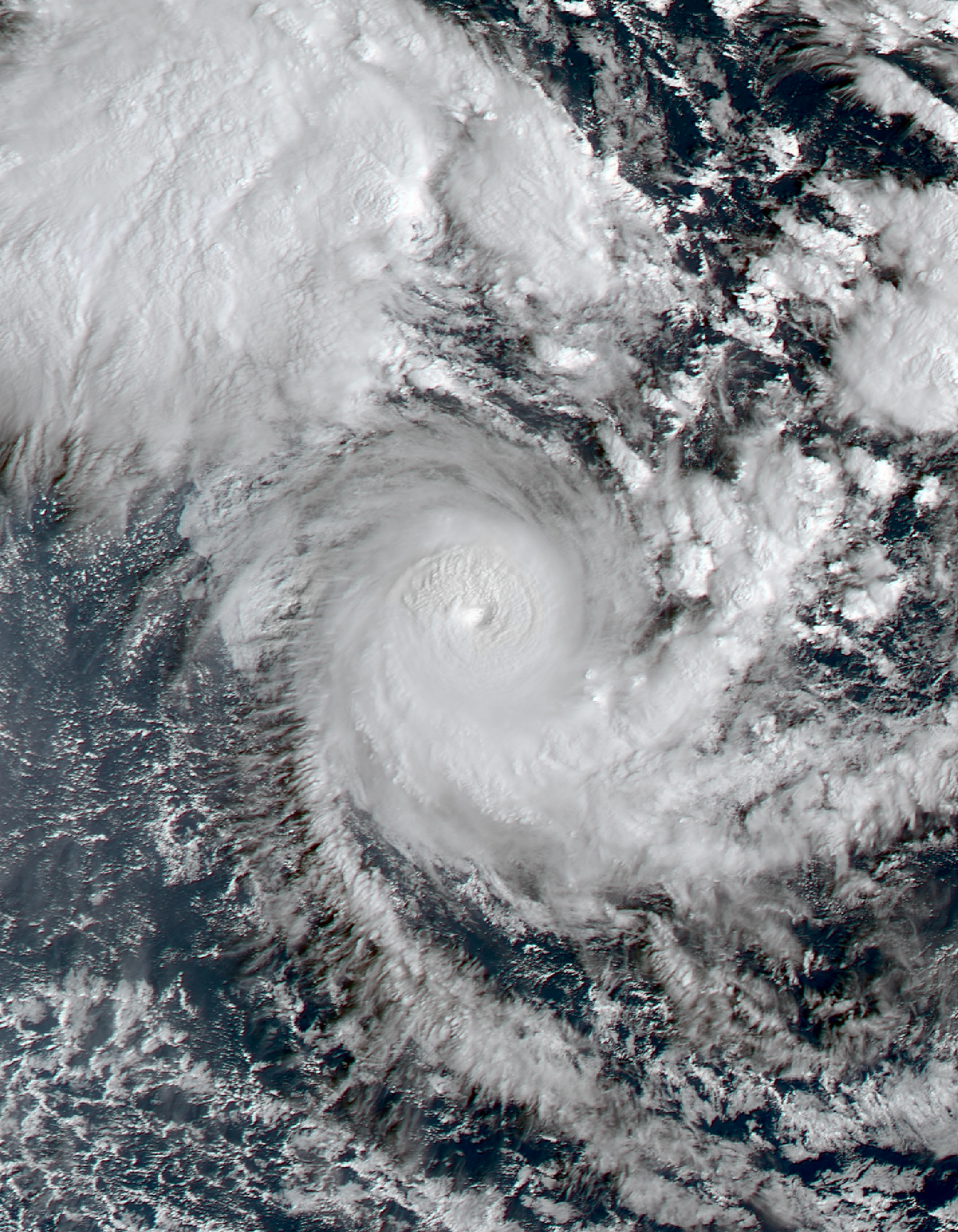
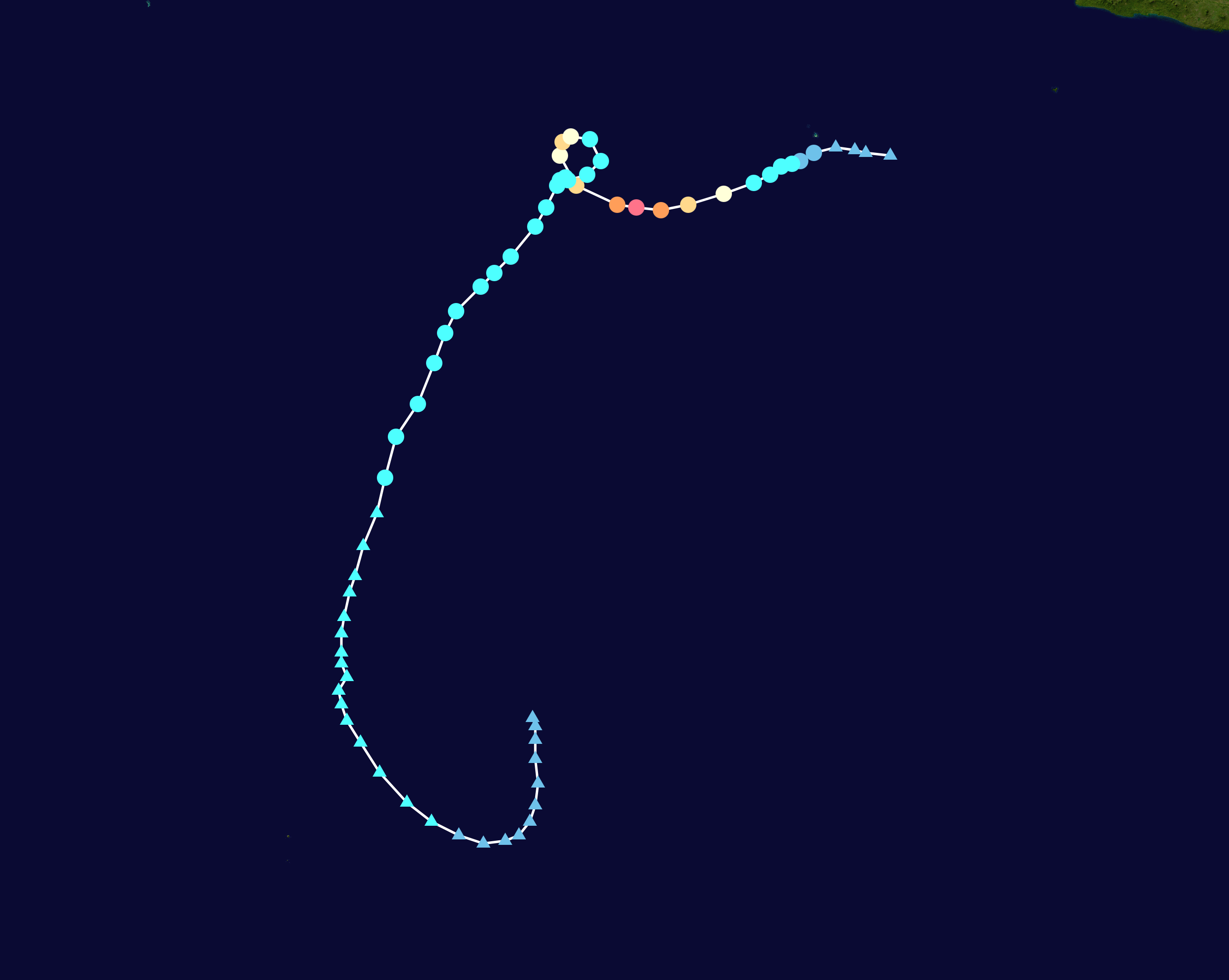
- Duration: 23 February – 26 February (Exited basin)
- Peak intensity: 185 km/h (115 mph) (10-min); 950 hPa (mbar)

On 23 February, the BoM reported that a tropical low had developed to the southwest of Christmas Island in the Indian Ocean, and designated it as 22U. By the next day, the JTWC started to monitor the low, and gave it a low chance of formation into a tropical cyclone. Under a favorable environment of warm sea surface temperatures, low wind shear, and increasing poleward outflow, the system organized further, prompting the JTWC to issue a TCFA at 14:00 UTC that same day. At 00:00 UTC on 25 February, the low intensified into a category 1 tropical cyclone in the Australian scale, with the BoM naming it as Vernon. The JTWC subsequently started to issue advisories. Moving west-southwest along the northern periphery of a deep-layered subtropical ridge to the south, Vernon went on a rapid intensification phase over the day, with BoM and JTWC upgrading Vernon into a category 3 severe tropical cyclone in the Australian scale and a category 1-equivalent tropical cyclone in the Saffir-Simpson scale respectively 12 hours later, as it developed a pinhole eye. Vernon then intensified to a category 4 severe tropical cyclone by the next day, as it started to move out of the basin and into the South-West Indian Ocean basin.

=== Tropical Low 21U ===
- Tropical low (Australian scale)
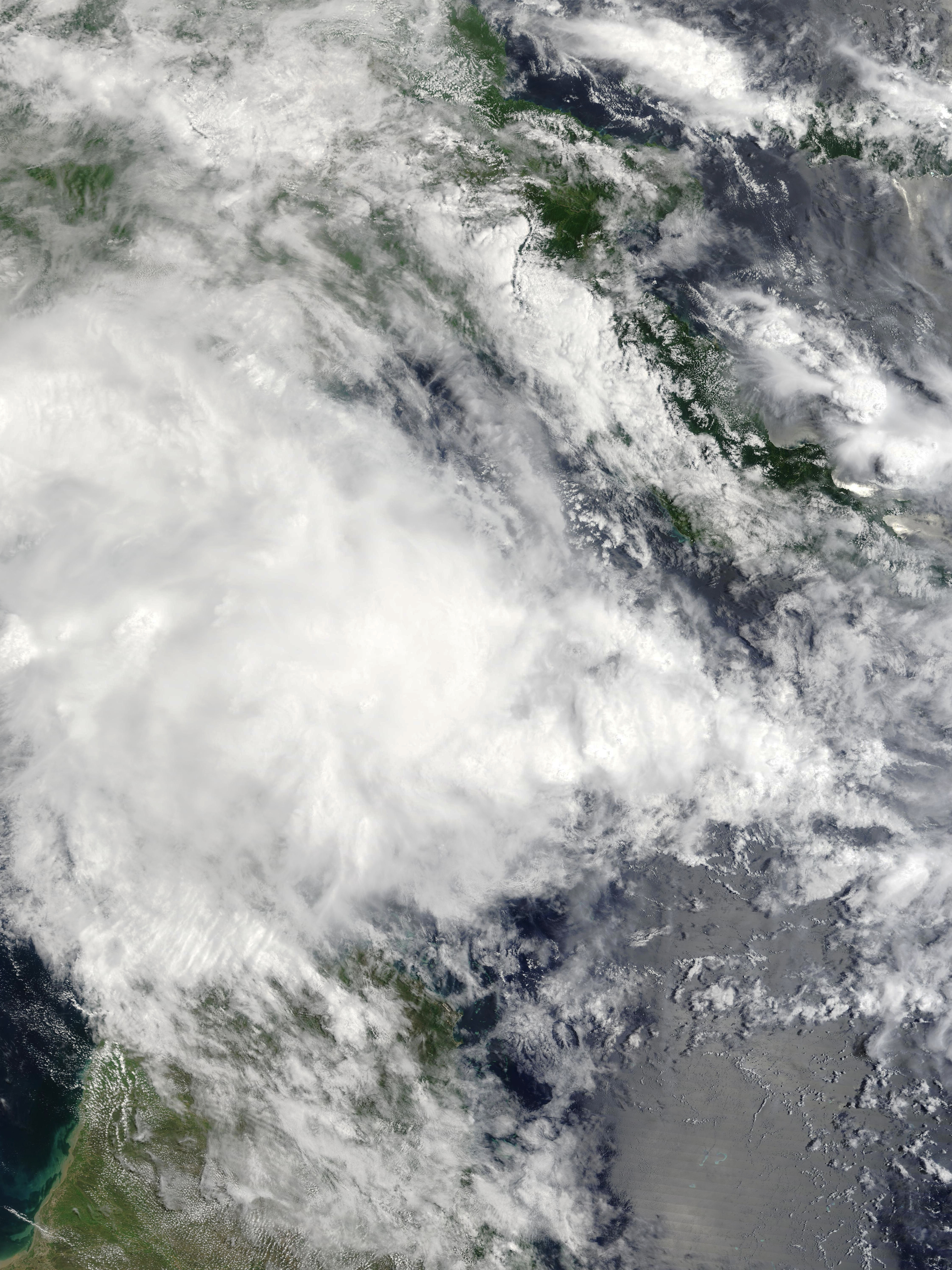
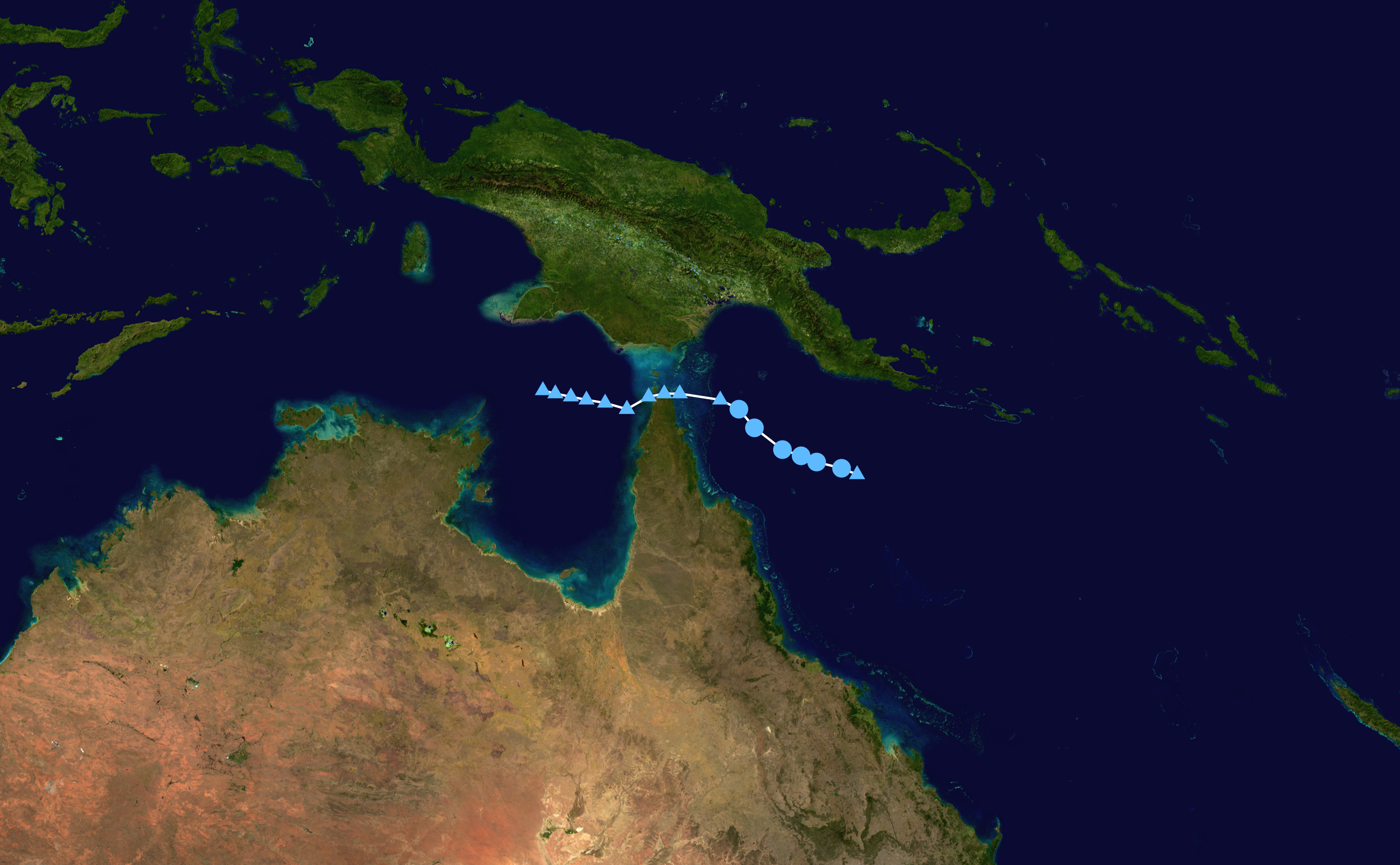
- Duration: 24 February – 27 February
- Peak intensity: Winds not specified; 1001 hPa (mbar)

On 20 February, the BoM noted a possible formation of a tropical low over the Arafura Sea, as a trough over northern Australia was expected to be more active. It was later predesignated as 21U. By 23 February, the JTWC started to monitor the low, and gave a low chance of formation in the next 24 hours. The BoM then reported the low was forming by the next day, near the Torres Strait, and gave a moderate chance of formation over the next 3 days. As the system continued to move east-southeast, it never organized further, prompting the JTWC to drop the system on their bulletins by 26 February. 21U was last noted by the next day, moving east and exiting the basin.

=== Tropical Cyclone Anika ===
- Category 2 tropical cyclone (Australian scale)
- Tropical storm (SSHWS)
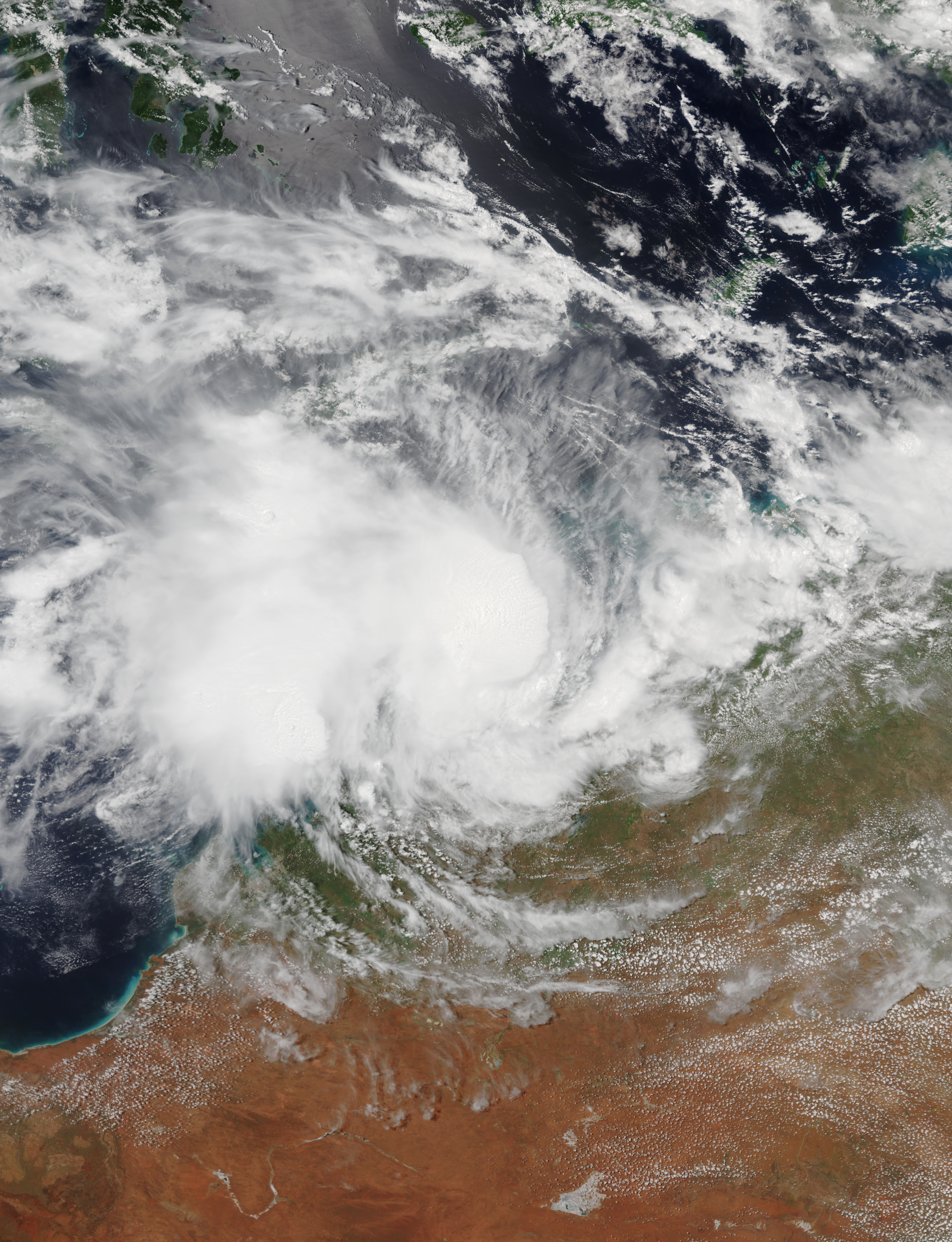
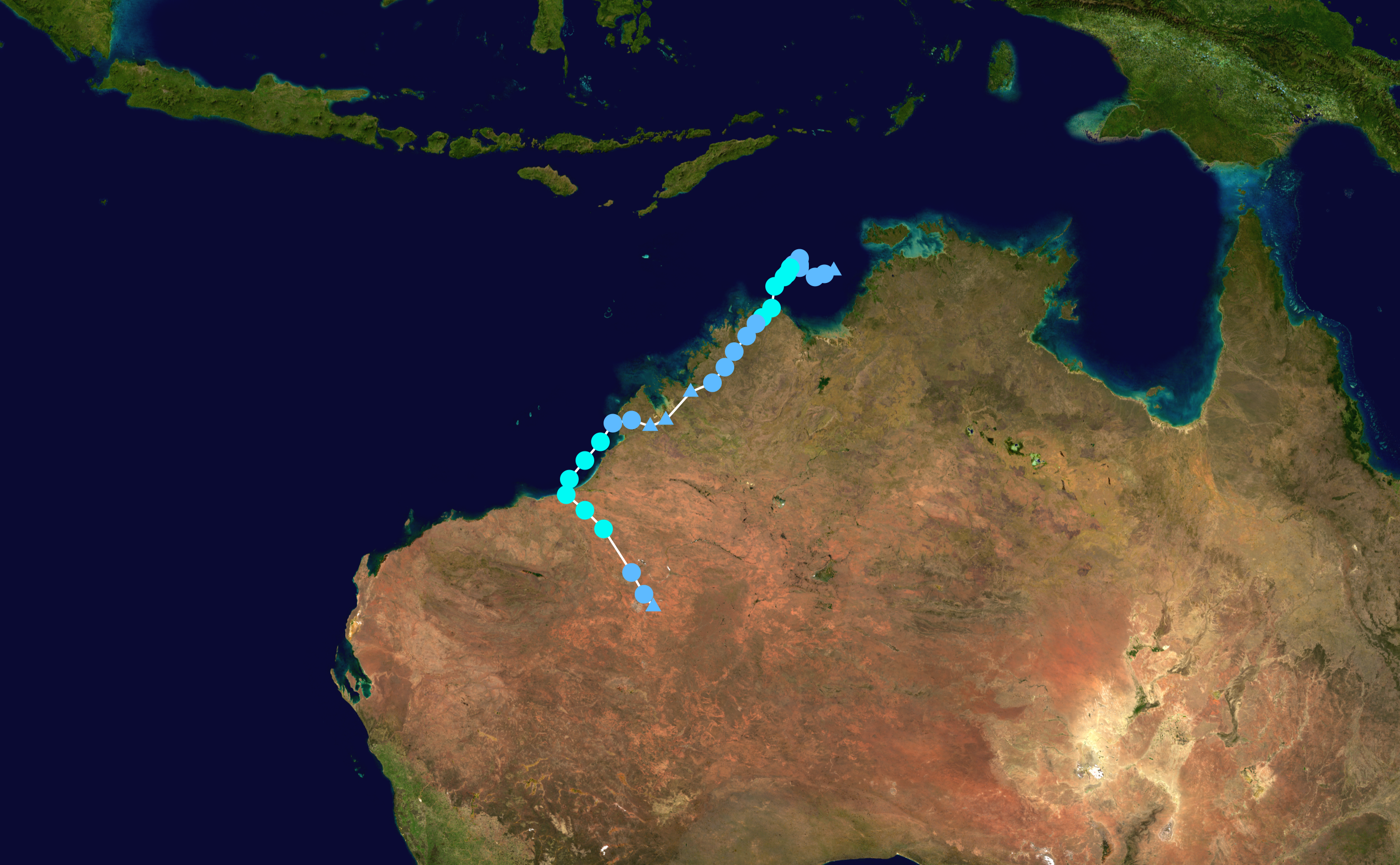
- Duration: 24 February – 3 March
- Peak intensity: 95 km/h (60 mph) (10-min); 978 hPa (mbar)

During 23 February, the BoM started to monitor an enhanced area of convection, that developed along a monsoon trough in the Timor Sea. The JTWC started to track the area late on the same day, and gave a low chance of formation into a tropical cyclone. By the next day, the convection organized into a tropical low, and the BoM designated it as 23U. Under a favorable environment of warm sea surface temperatures and pronounced outflow being offset by high wind shear, the low continued to organize, with the JTWC issuing a TCFA late on 24 February. At 15:00 UTC the next day, the low intensified into a category 1 tropical cyclone, with the BoM naming it as Anika. The JTWC subsequently followed suit and upgraded the system into a tropical storm, noting deep and cold convection covering its low-level circulation center. By 25 January, Anika intensified to a category 2 cyclone, before making landfall in the Kimberley coast, to the east of Kalumburu at 12:00 UTC that same day. As a result, the BoM downgraded Anika to an ex-tropical cyclone. The JTWC subsequently issued their final advisory on the system.

Anika then moved southeastwards, emerging to the Indian Ocean on 1 March. During this time, the system initially struggled to redevelop, as its mid-level circulation center was displaced significantly to the south. The JTWC issued a TCFA on Anika that same day, before upgrading the system back into a tropical storm, as banding was wrapping to its center. The BoM then re-upgraded Anika to a category 1 tropical cyclone at 06:00 UTC the next day, before briefly reintensifying to a category 2 tropical cyclone as it made its second landfall near Wallal. The JTWC subsequently discontinued issuing advisories on Anika once again. It weakened into a category 1 tropical cyclone as it moved further inland, before becoming a tropical low on 3 March. It dissipated by the next day.

Anika caused trees to fall in Kimberley, and more than 260 mm of precipitation was recorded according to the BoM.

=== Tropical Low 25U ===
- Tropical low (Australian scale)
- Tropical storm (SSHWS)
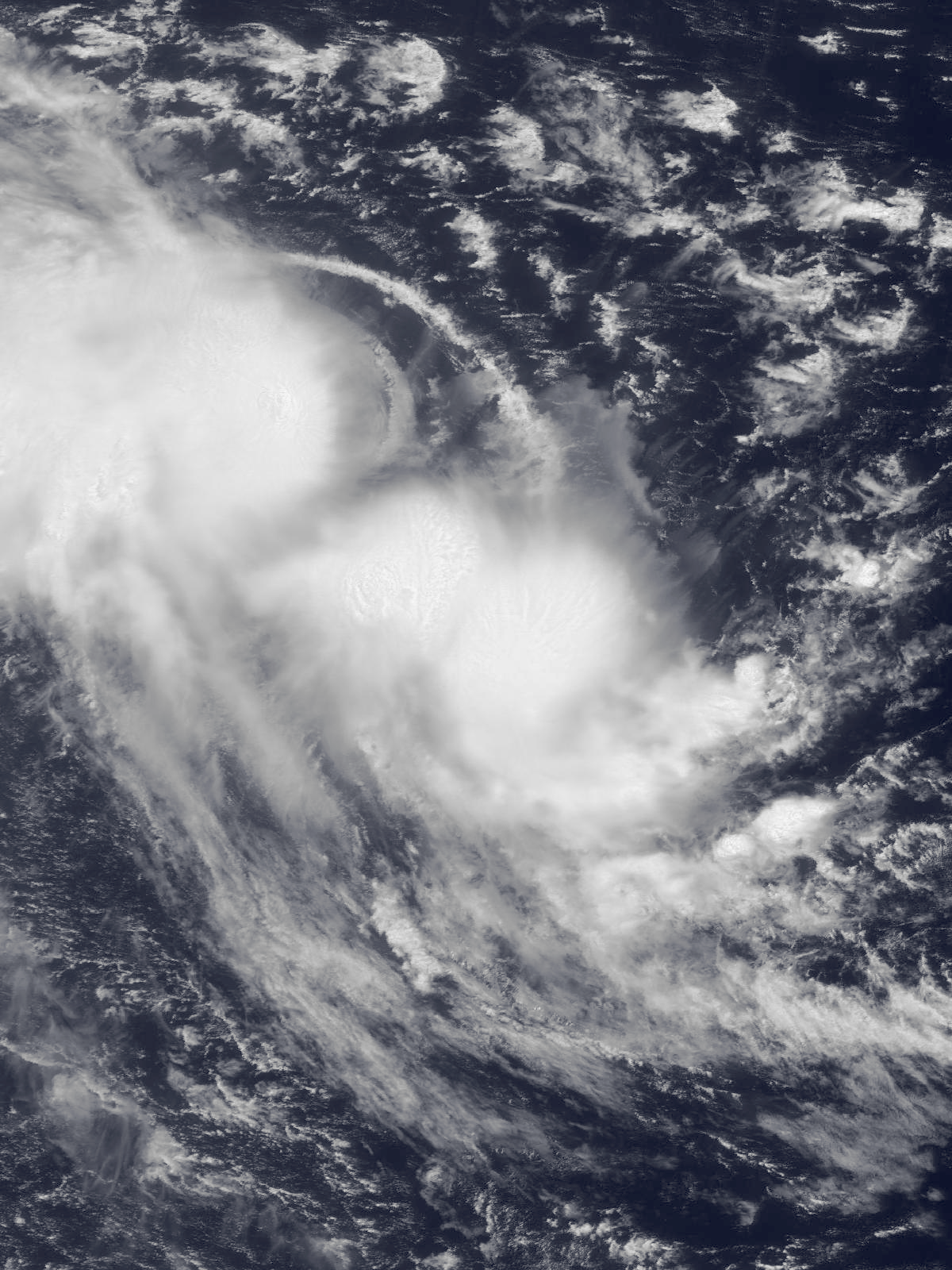
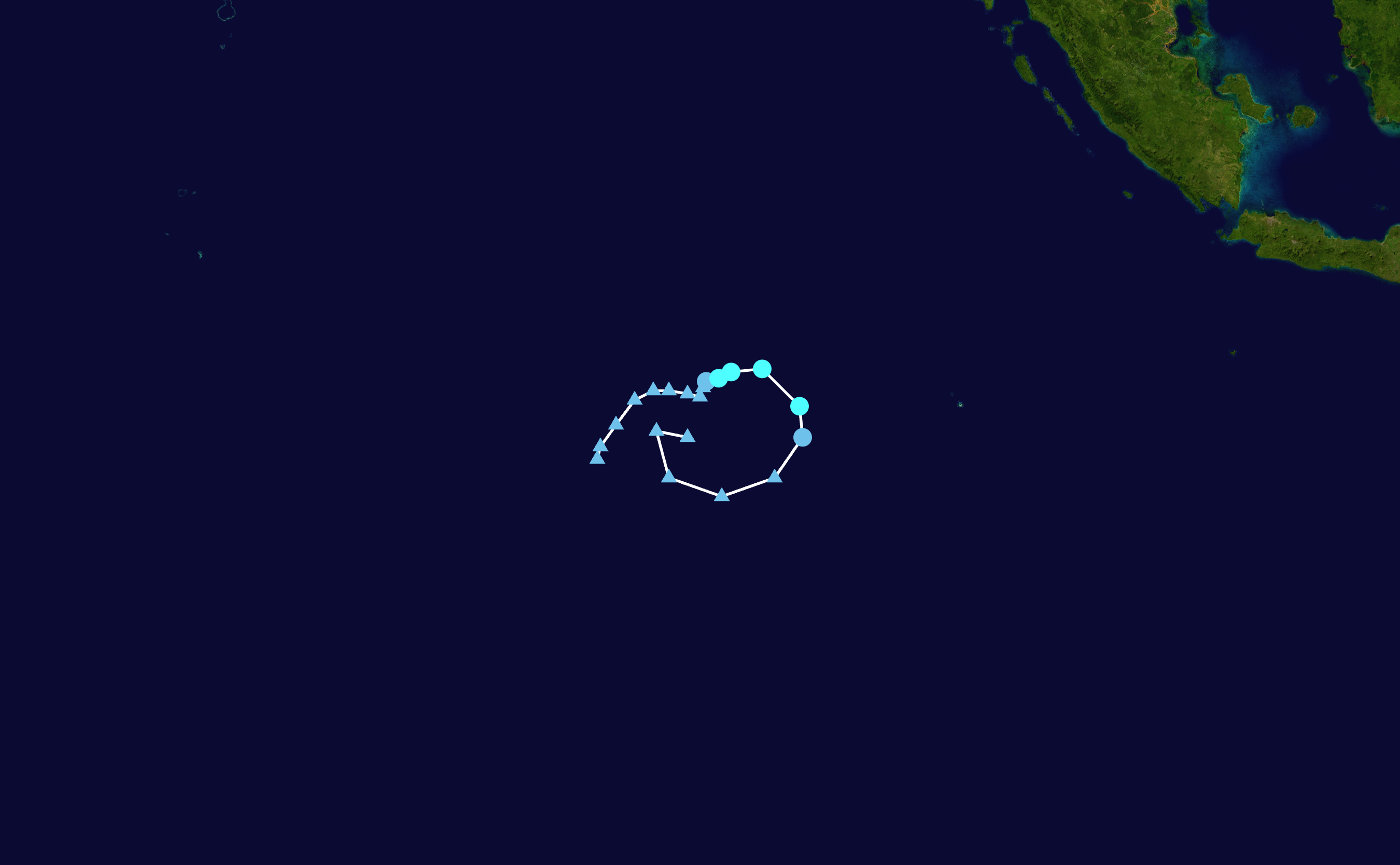
- Duration: 26 February (Entered basin) – 27 February (Exited basin)
- Peak intensity: 85 km/h (50 mph) (10-min); 996 hPa (mbar)

On 26 February, Moderate Tropical Storm 08 briefly moved into the western portion of the basin while undergoing a fujiwhara interaction with Severe Tropical Cyclone Vernon, and was designated by BoM as Tropical Low 25U. 25U was last noted on 27 February where it moved back to the South-West Indian Ocean basin.

=== Tropical Low 26U ===
- Tropical low (Australian scale)
- Tropical storm (SSHWS)
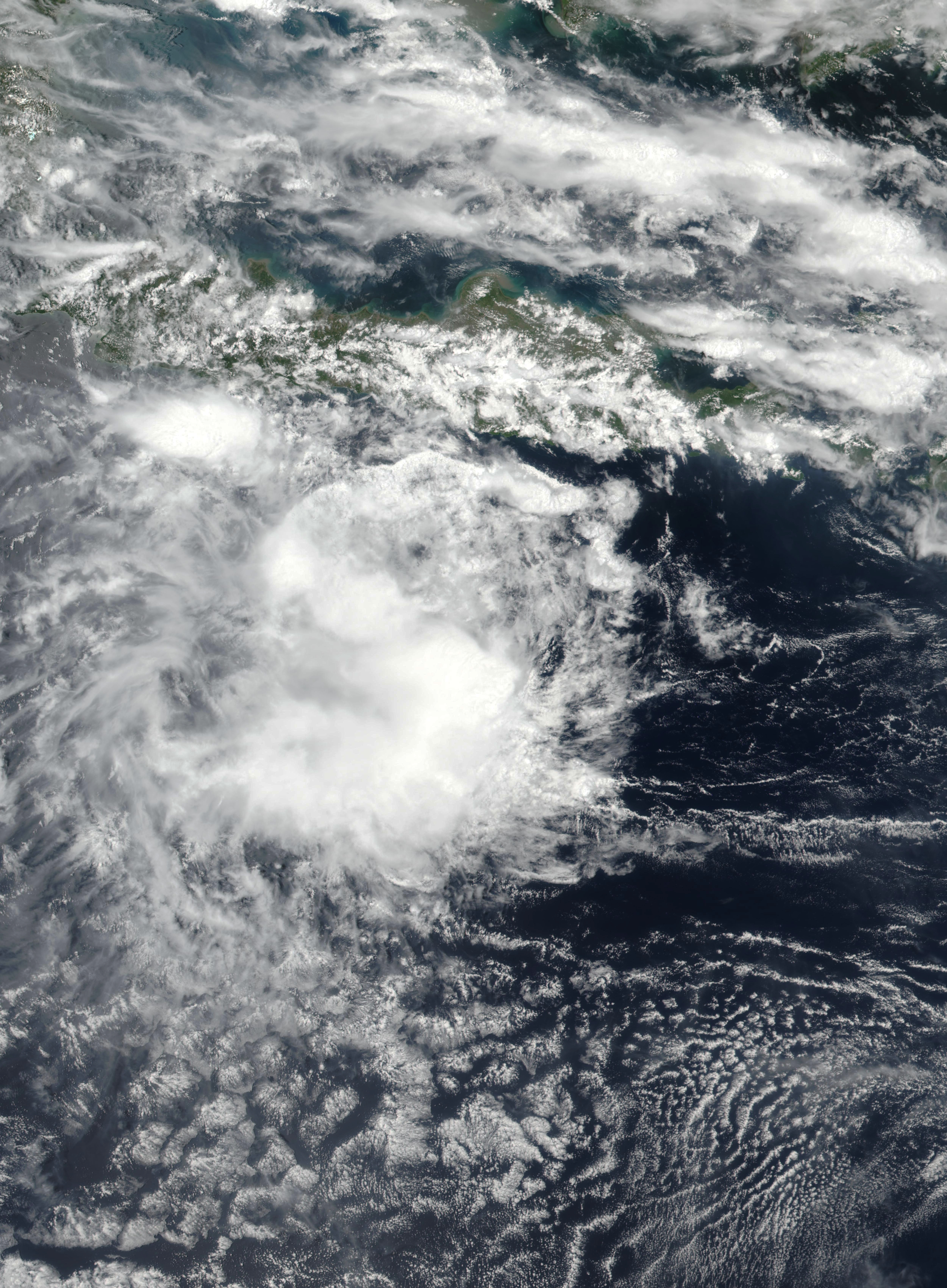
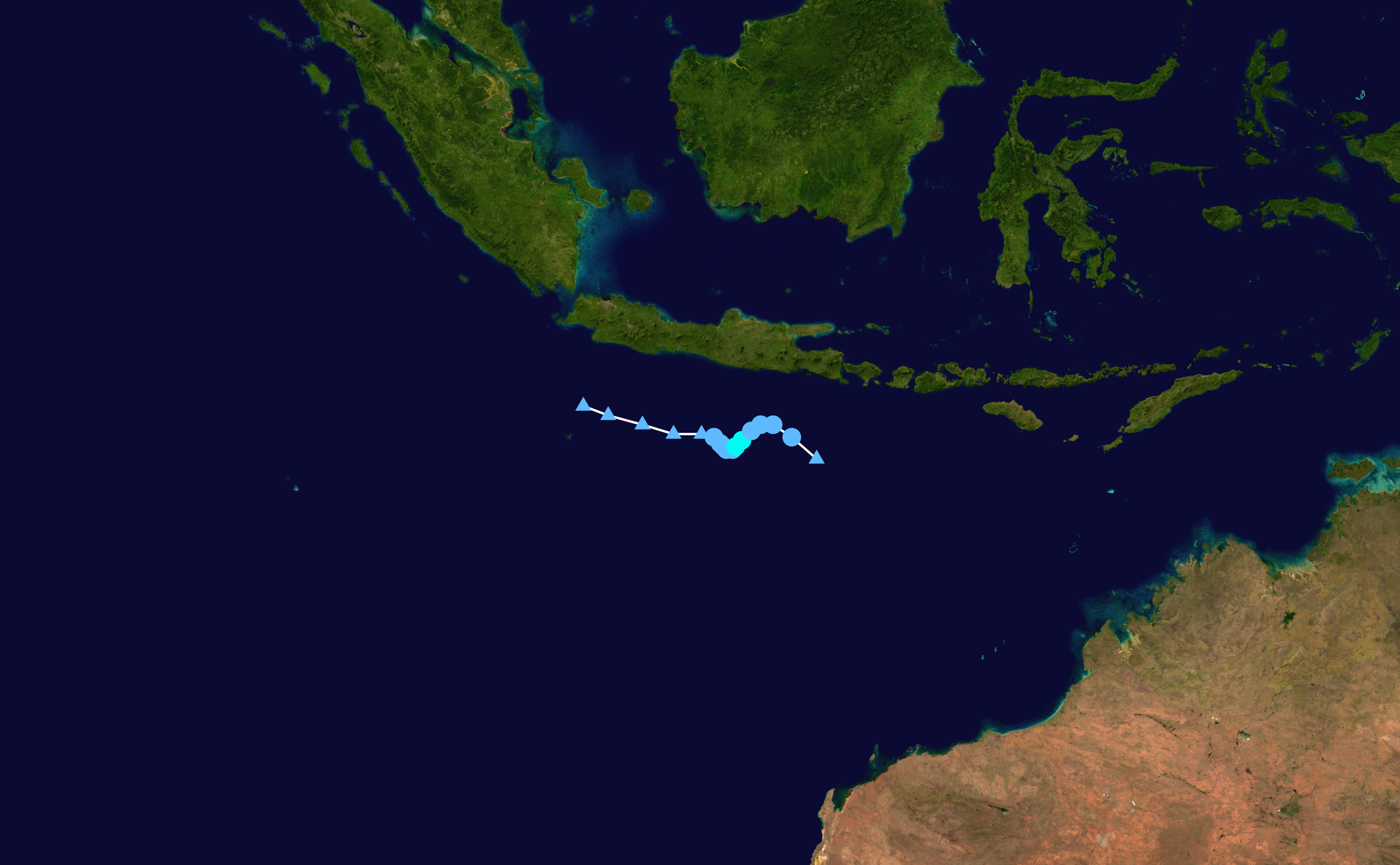
- Duration: 27 February – 4 March
- Peak intensity: 65 km/h (40 mph) (1-min); 1004 hPa (mbar)

On 27 February, the BoM reported that Tropical Low 26U had formed about 295 km (183 mi) to the east of Christmas Island, and gave a low chance of formation over the next 3 days. The JTWC started to monitor the low the next day, and also gave a low chance of formation over the next 24 hours. Under a marginal environment of warm sea surface temperatures and robust outflow aloft offset by high wind shear, the low started to consolidate, prompting the agency to issue a TCFA late on 1 March. By the next day, the JTWC upgraded 26U to a tropical storm, designating it as 17S. At that time, the system was already disorganized, with flaring convection being sheared off to the west of its exposed, elongated low-level circulation center. As its LLCC continued to become more exposed, and its central convection becoming more disorganized, the JTWC discontinued issuing advisories for 26U late on the same day. The BoM stopped monitoring the low on 4 February, as it moved southeast while continuing to weaken.

=== Tropical Cyclone Billy ===
- Category 2 tropical cyclone (Australian scale)
- Category 1 tropical cyclone (SSHWS)
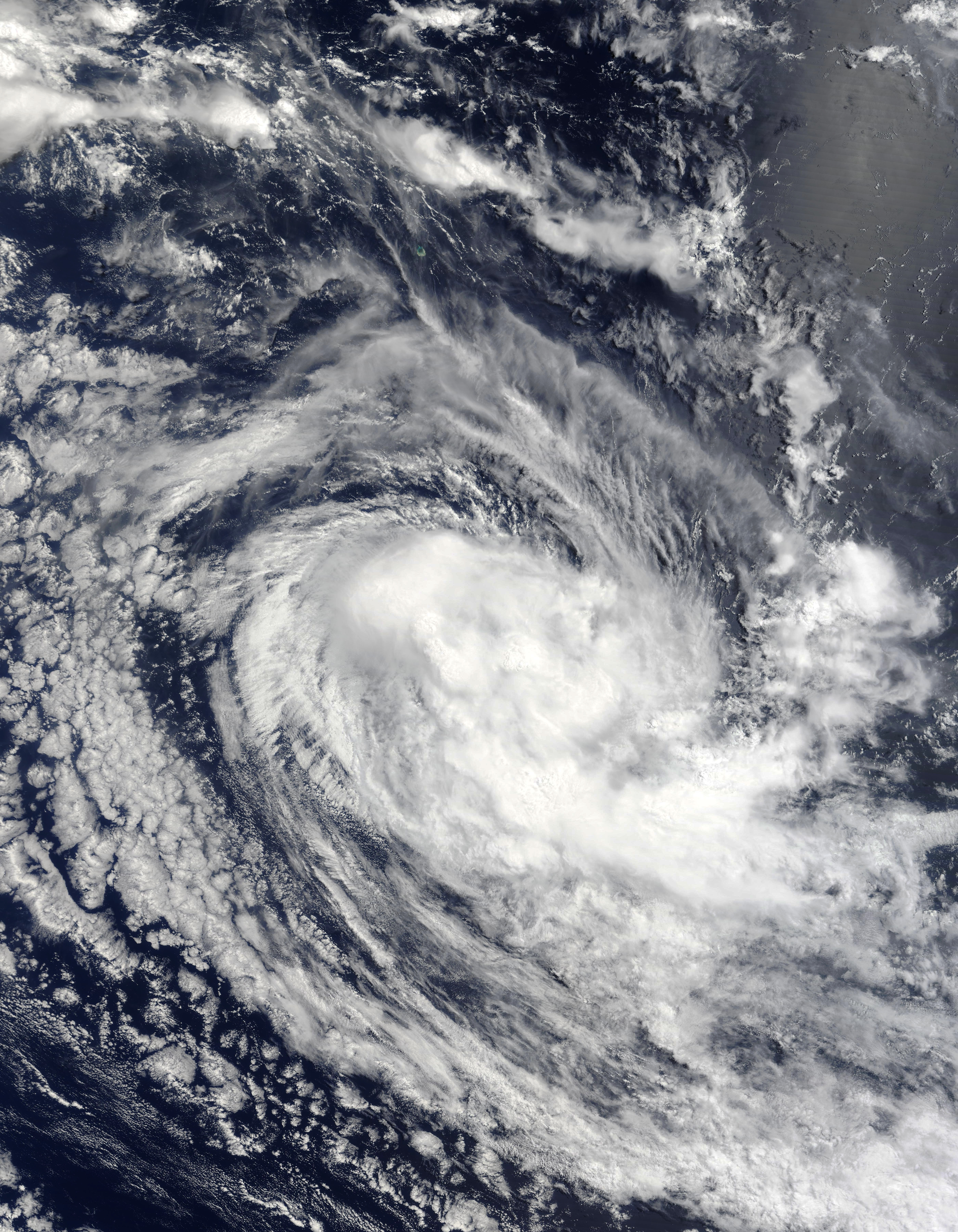
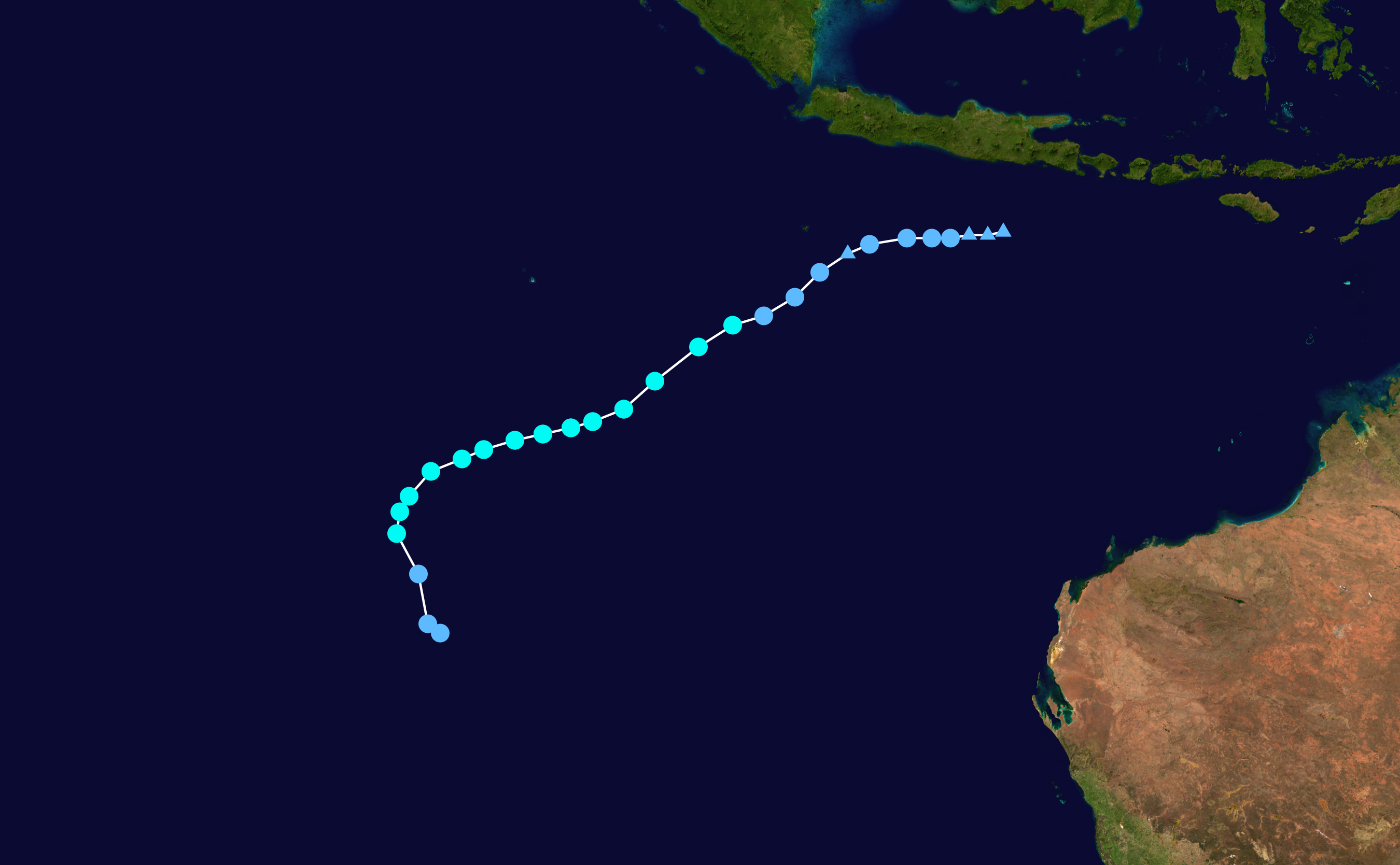
- Duration: 12 March – 16 March
- Peak intensity: 95 km/h (60 mph) (10-min); 988 hPa (mbar)

On 9 March, the BoM noted that a tropical low is expected to develop to the south of Java, Indonesia. The low started to develop two days later, on 11 March. Late on the same day, the JTWC started to monitor the low, and gave a low chance of formation as it started to organize. Moving west-southwestward under an environment of warm sea surface temperatures, low to moderate vertical wind shear and strong radial outflow aloft, the low continued to improve, prompting the JTWC to issue a TCFA on 13 March, before initiating advisories on Tropical Cyclone 20S late on the same day.

By 14 March, the BoM estimated the low, now designated as 27U, had reached tropical cyclone intensity; operationally, they did not upgrade the system. 27U continued to intensify, reaching peak intensity late on the same day as a category 2 tropical cyclone on the Australian scale. The JTWC estimated its peak intensity with 1-minute sustained winds of 60 knots (110 km/h; 69 mph), based on microwave imagery showing a well-formed eye. On 15 March, the BoM gave 27U the name Billy, before the system started to weaken due to a dry air entrainment, along with increasing wind shear. By 16 March, the BoM declared Billy as an ex-tropical cyclone, as convection associated with the system became sheared to the southeast of its low-level circulation center. The JTWC continued to issue advisories to the system as gale-force winds continued to prevail, until the next day, when Billy weakened below gale-force. The system dissipated on the same day.

=== Severe Tropical Cyclone Charlotte ===
- Category 4 severe tropical cyclone (Australian scale)
- Category 2 tropical cyclone (SSHWS)
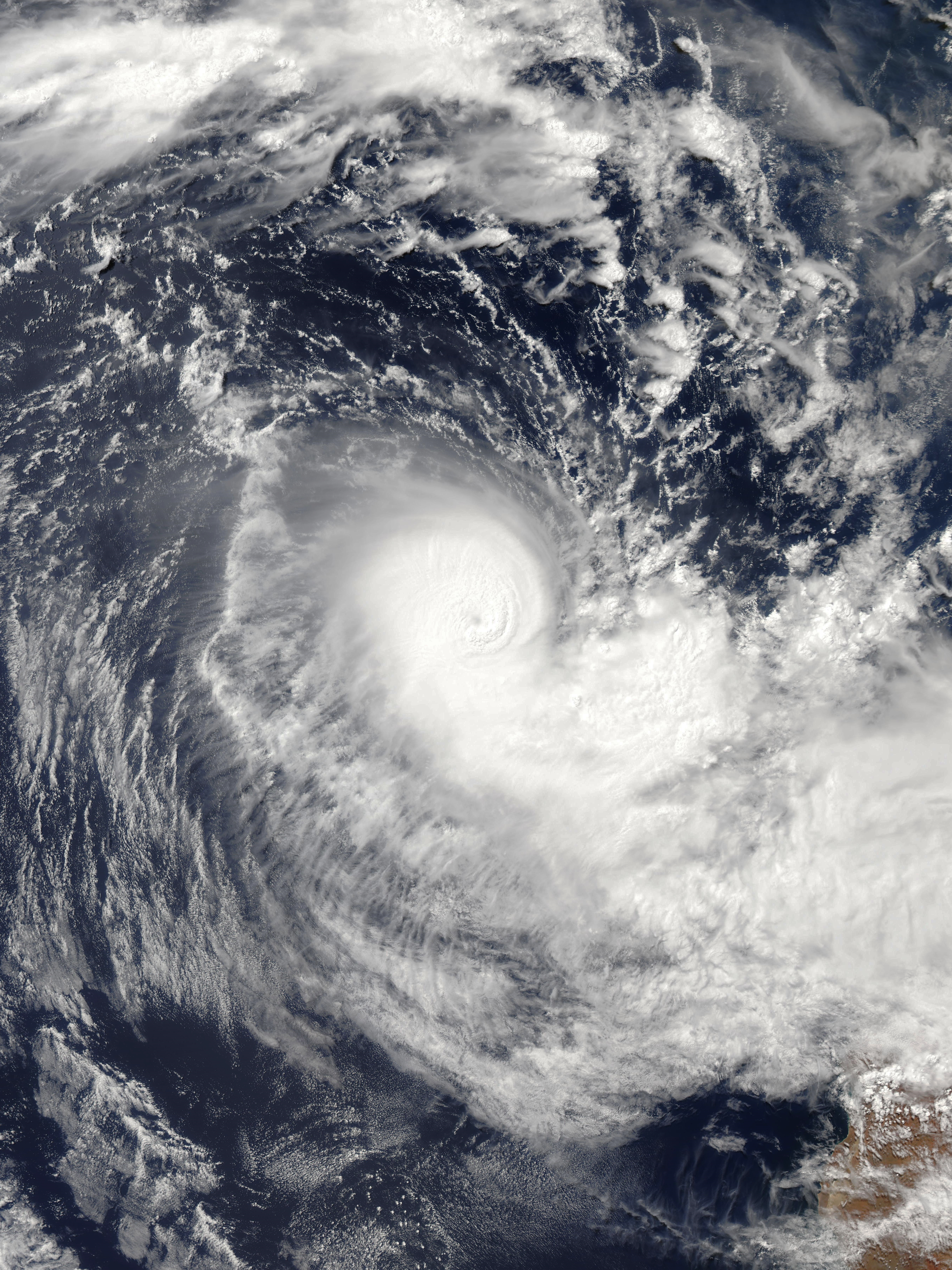
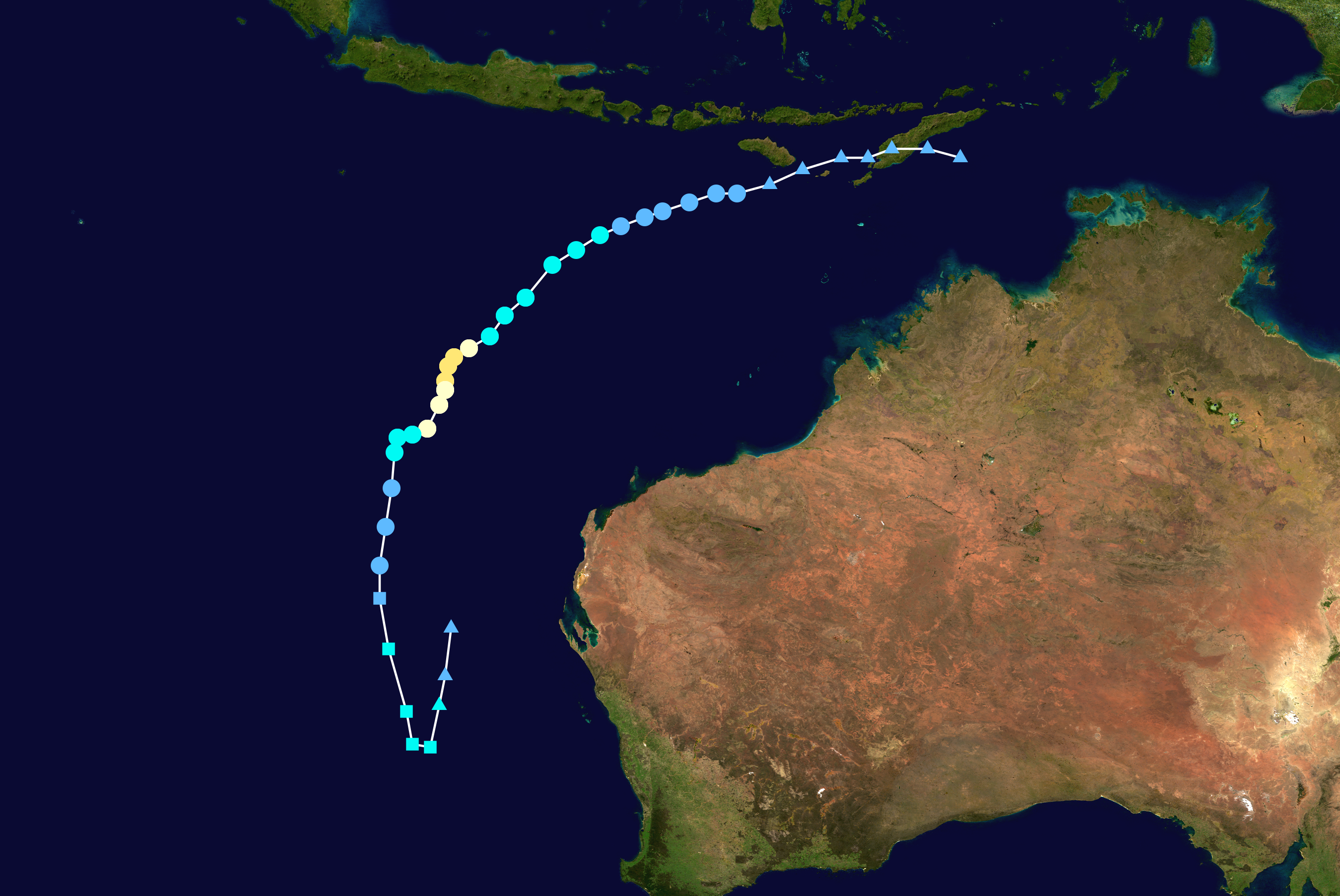
- Duration: 16 March – 23 March
- Peak intensity: 165 km/h (105 mph) (10-min); 956 hPa (mbar)

On 12 March, the BoM noted that a tropical low may form in the Arafura Sea in the next 3 days. The low developed 3 days later, to the north of the Northern Territory. As it moved westwards across Timor-Leste into the Indian Ocean, the JTWC started to monitor the system on 18 March, with deep convection displaced to the west of its elongated low-level circulation center. Under a favorable environment of warm sea surface temperatures, low vertical wind shear and good poleward outflow aided by the upper-level westerlies associated with a mid-latitude trough to the south, the low started to consolidate, prompting the agency to issue a TCFA by the next day. On 20 March, the BoM started to issue advisories on the low, and assigned the identifier 28U. The JTWC subsequently followed suit, and upgraded the low into a tropical storm, designating it as 21S. 28U reached tropical cyclone intensity afterwards, with the BoM naming it as Charlotte.

By the next day, Charlotte started to rapidly intensify, reaching category 2 status in the Australian scale at 00:00 UTC. Around 21:00 UTC, the storm developed a 6 nautical miles (11 km; 6.9 mi) clear eye, which made the cyclone achieve its peak intensity as a category 4 severe tropical cyclone, with 10-minute sustained winds of 90 knots (170 km/h; 100 mph). The JTWC subsequently upgraded Charlotte to a Category 2-equivalent cyclone in the Saffir-Simpson scale on 22 March. Charlotte then started to weaken, as shear began to increase. The BoM and JTWC estimated Charlotte to have weakened to a category 3 severe tropical cyclone, and a category 1-equivalent tropical cyclone, respectively, late on the same day. As its low-level circulation center became exposed on 23 March, the BoM downgraded Charlotte to a category 2 tropical cyclone at 12:00 UTC, before it weakened into a remnant low six hours later. The JTWC subsequently downgraded the system to a tropical storm 3 hours later, before discontinuing advisories by the next day. The BoM continued to track Charlotte until 25 March.

As it moved over Timor-Leste, it brought heavy rain towards the country, however there were no damages reported.

=== Tropical Low 30U ===
- Tropical low (Australian scale)
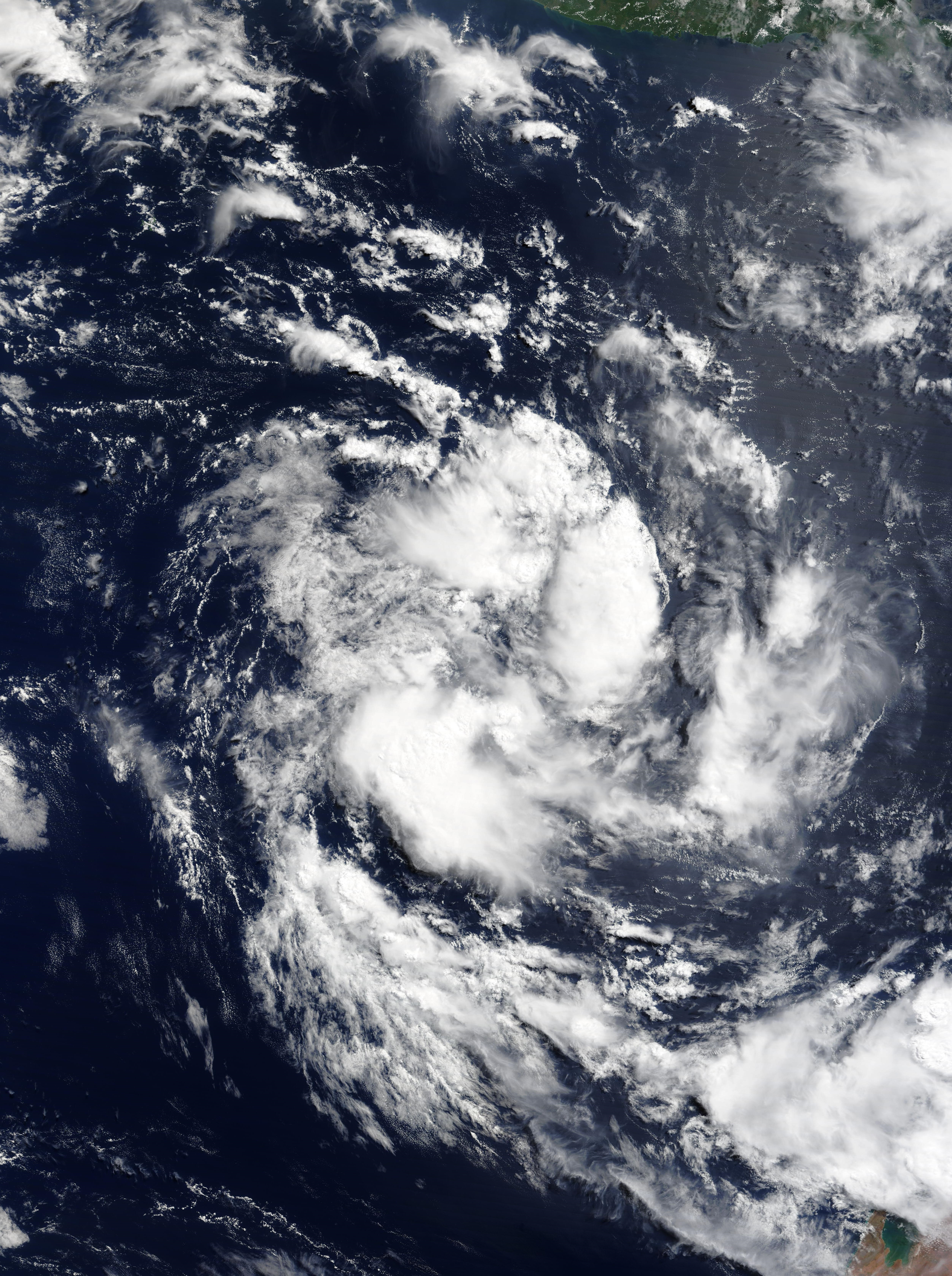
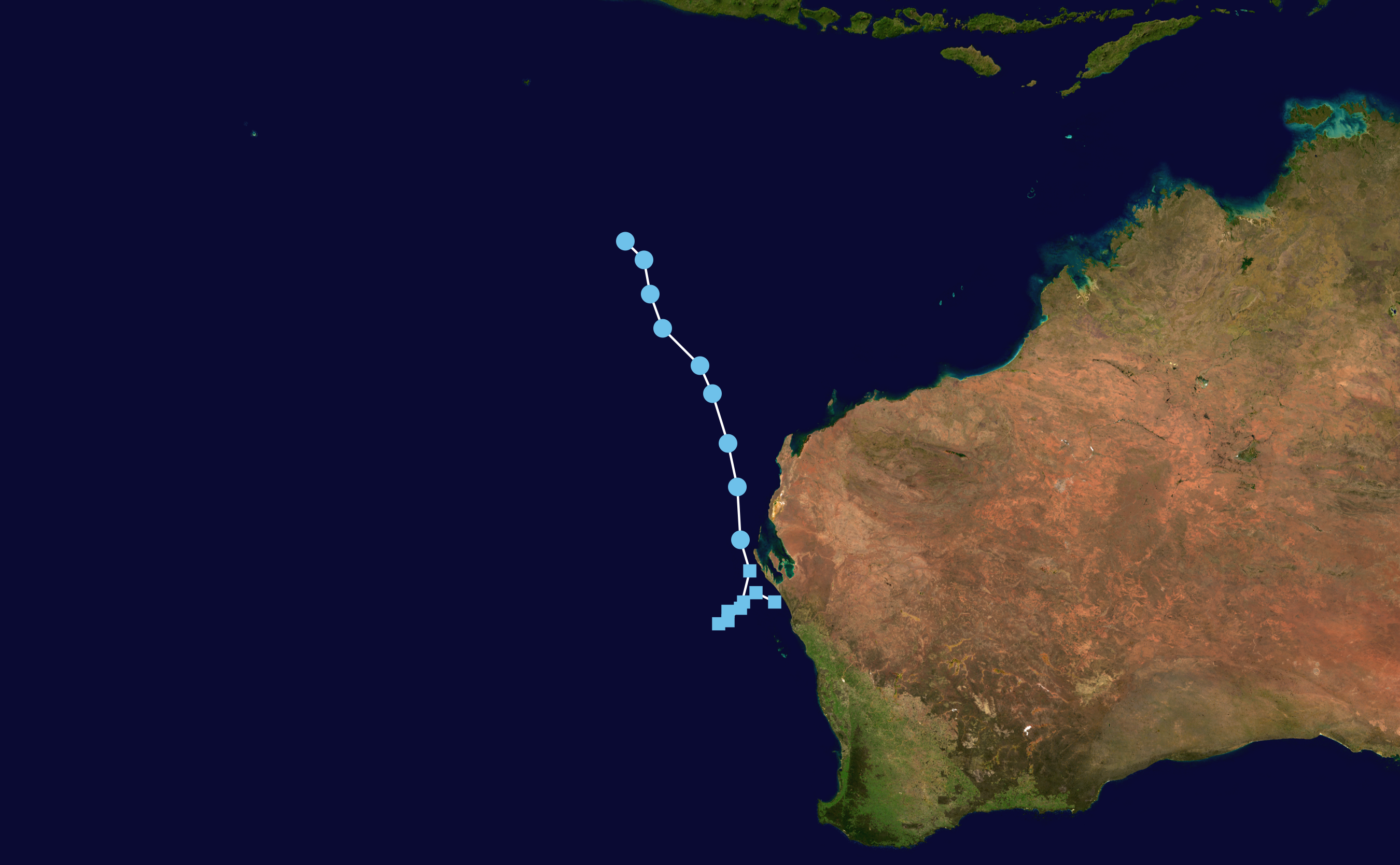
- Duration: 30 March – 1 April
- Peak intensity: 45 km/h (30 mph) (10-min); 1004 hPa (mbar)

On 30 March, the BoM reported that Tropical Low 30U was developing south of Christmas Island, near 810 km (500 mi) northwest of Exmouth. The JTWC also started to monitor the system, giving a low chance of formation in the next 24 hours. Although in a favorable environment of warm sea surface temperatures, low vertical wind shear and robust poleward outflow aloft, the low failed to organize as shear started to increase, prompting the JTWC to drop the system on 1 April. The cyclone transitioned to a subtropical low at the same day as it moved south, before dissipating near Kalbarri two days later.

As the low approached the southern Western Australia coast, it brought heavy rainfall along the area, with 118.66 millimetres (4.672 in) of rain reported at Carnarvon. Localized flooding caused road disruptions including the closure of the North West Coastal Highway from south of Carnarvon to the Shark Bay road for two days. Flash flood impacts were reported in Carnarvon with minor inundation of some roads, commercial and residential buildings.

=== Tropical Low 32U ===
- Tropical low (Australian scale)
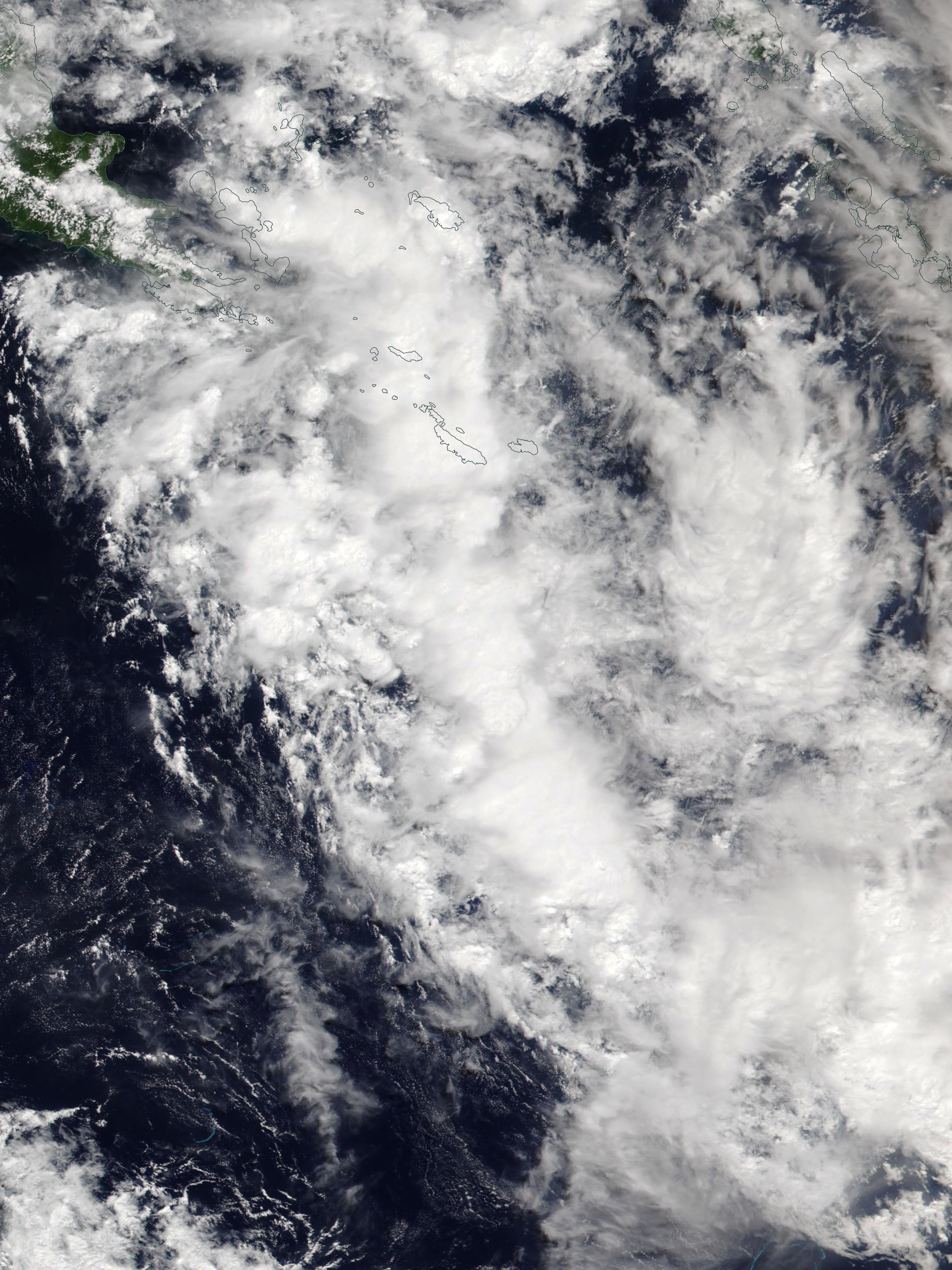
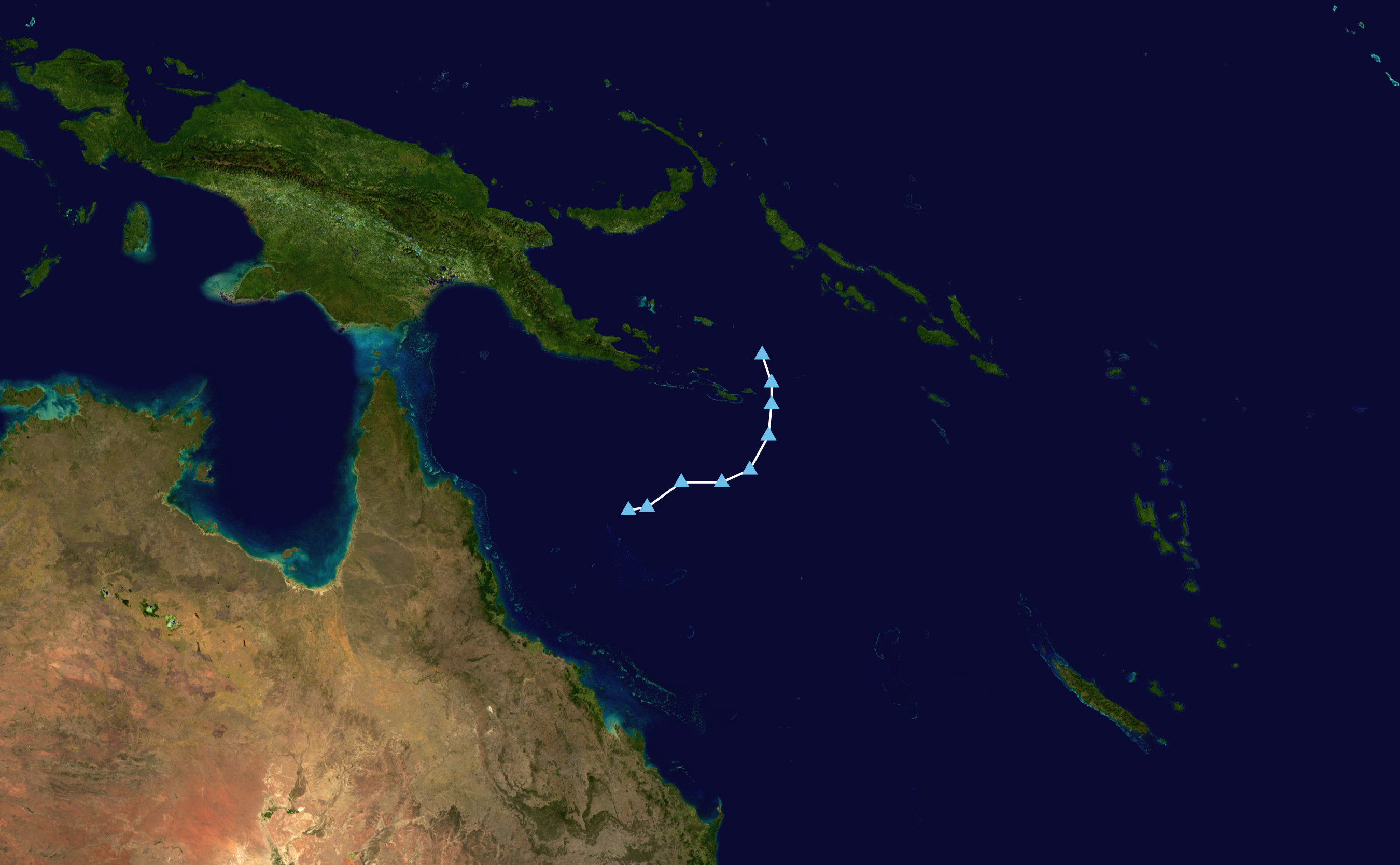
- Duration: 8 April – 9 April
- Peak intensity: Winds not specified; 1005 hPa (mbar)

According to a bulletin released by the Bureau of Meteorology on the morning of 8 April, a new tropical low formed in Papua New Guinea. It was designated as 32U. 32U lost its tropical characteristics on 9 April without affecting any habitable areas.

=== Tropical Low 33U ===
- Tropical low (Australian scale)
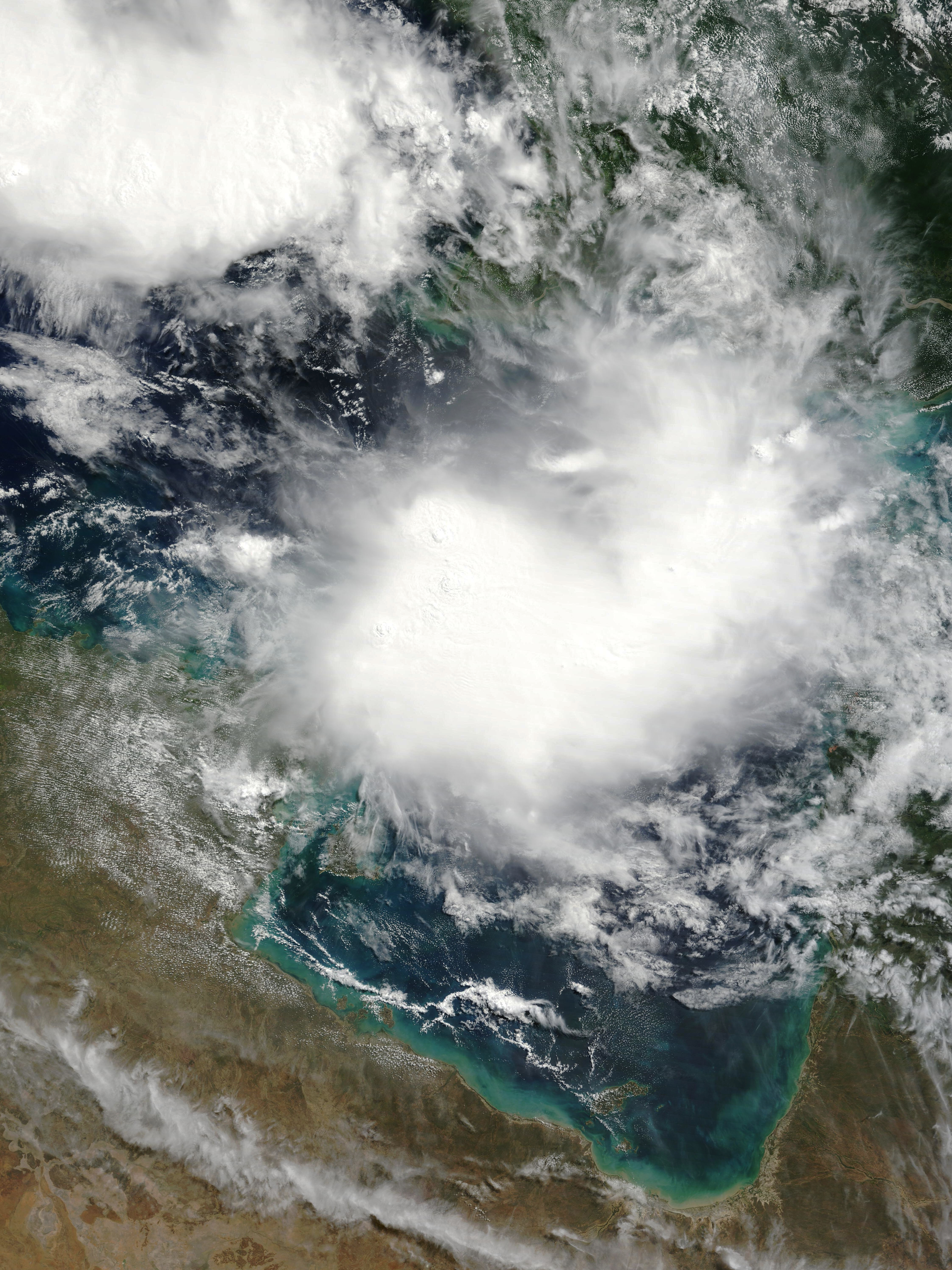
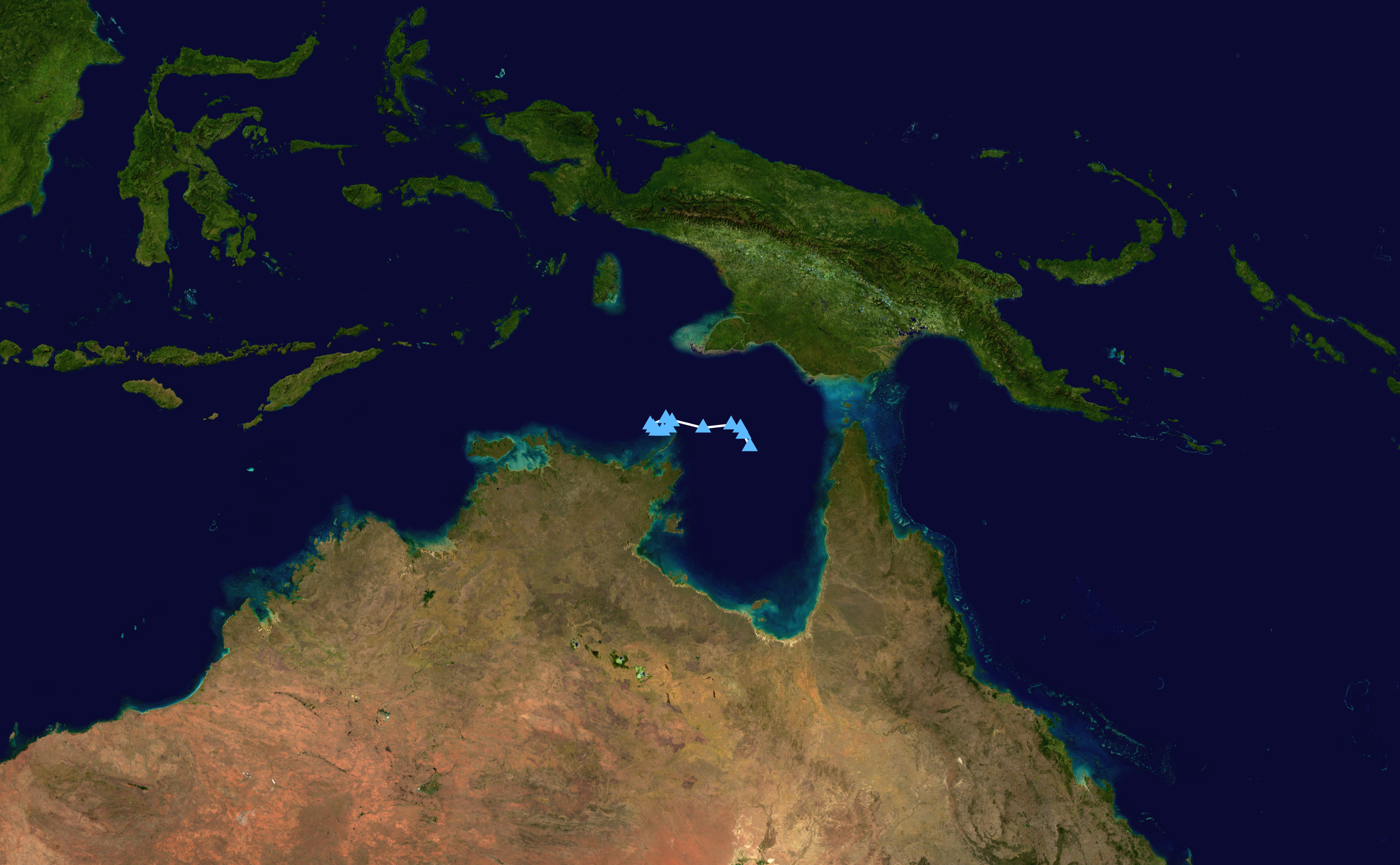
- Duration: 17 April – 19 April
- Peak intensity: Winds not specified; 1005 hPa (mbar)

On 17 April, the BoM reported that Tropical Low 33U had formed, about 155 km (96 mi) to the northwest of the Gove Peninsula. 33U slowly headed northwards, before the BoM stopped monitoring the low on 19 April.

=== Tropical Low 37U ===
- Tropical low (Australian scale)
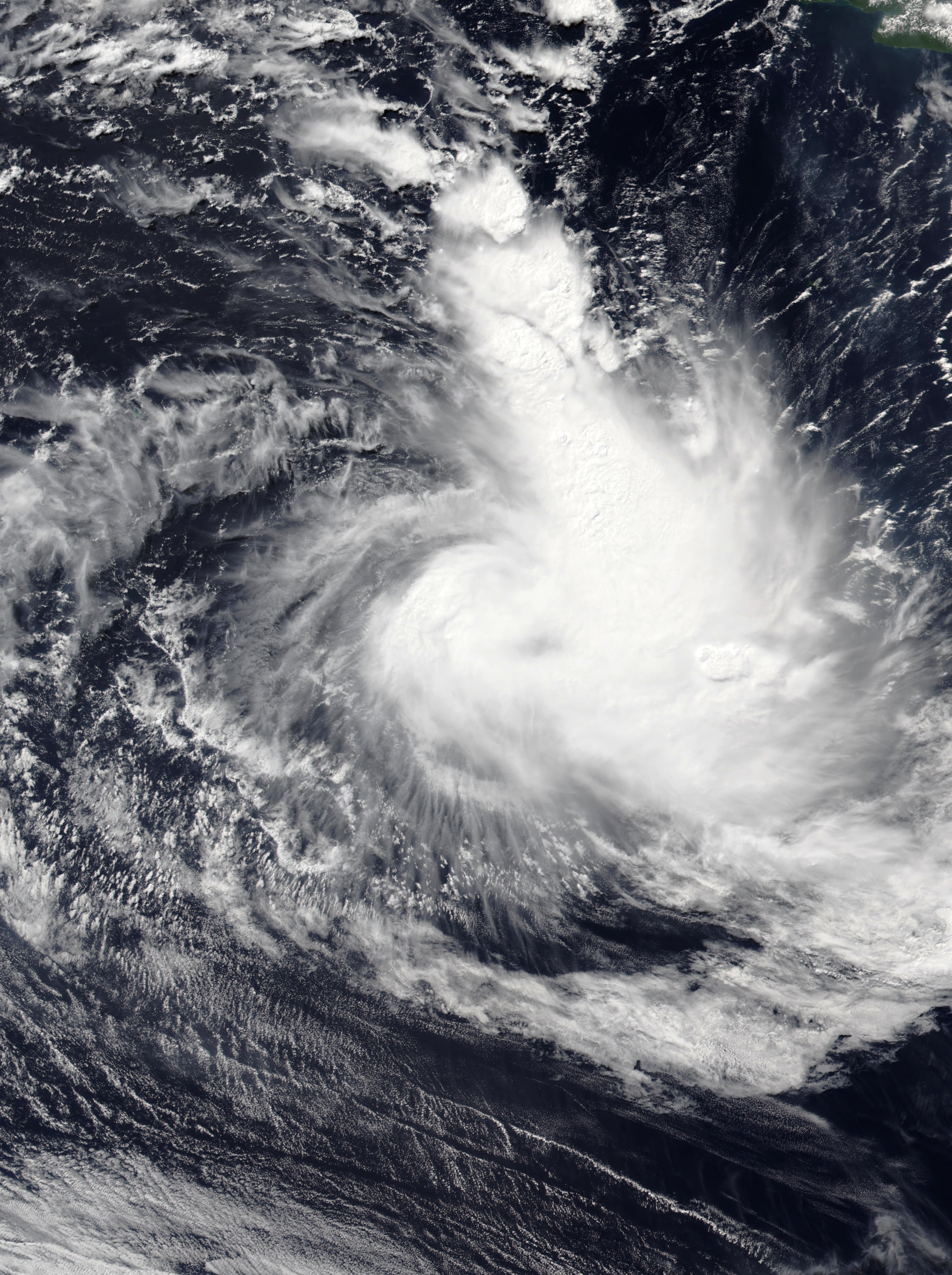
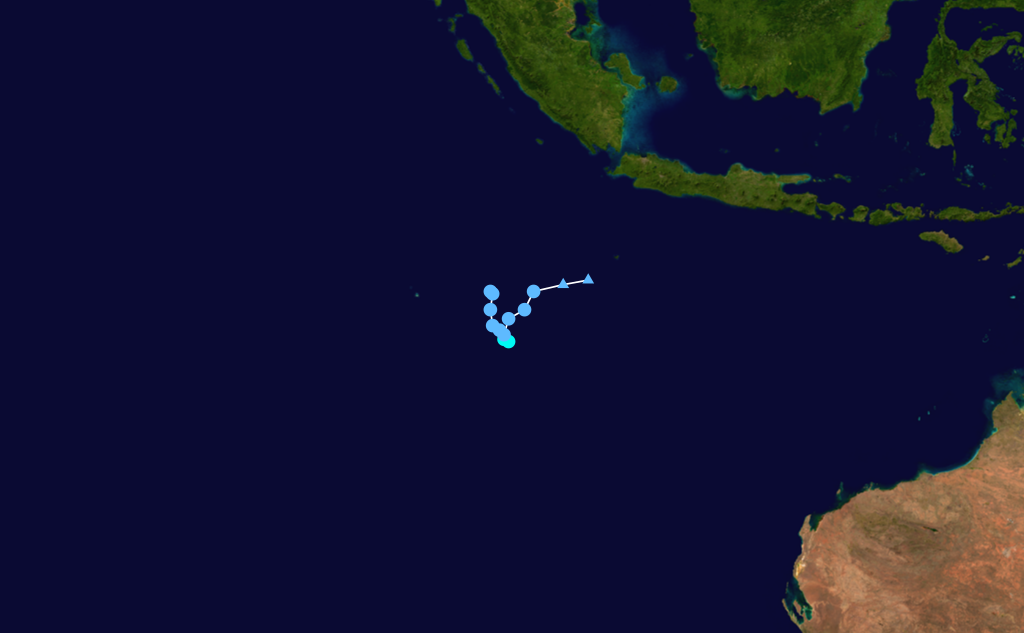
- Duration: 24 April – 26 April
- Peak intensity: 75 km/h (45 mph) (10-min); 996 hPa (mbar)

A tropical low formed 420 km (260 mi) from Christmas Island, according to the Bureau Of Meteorology technical bulletin, and was designated 34U. The cyclone intensified and the agency released unusual bulletins about the possibility of reaching Category 1, even though it did not pose a threat to any habitable areas.

Upon post-analysis, the BoM found that another low-level circulation center formed on 25 April that was not part of 34U; hence, the earlier system was assigned the identifier 37U.

=== Tropical Low 34U ===
- Tropical low (Australian scale)
- Tropical storm (SSHWS)
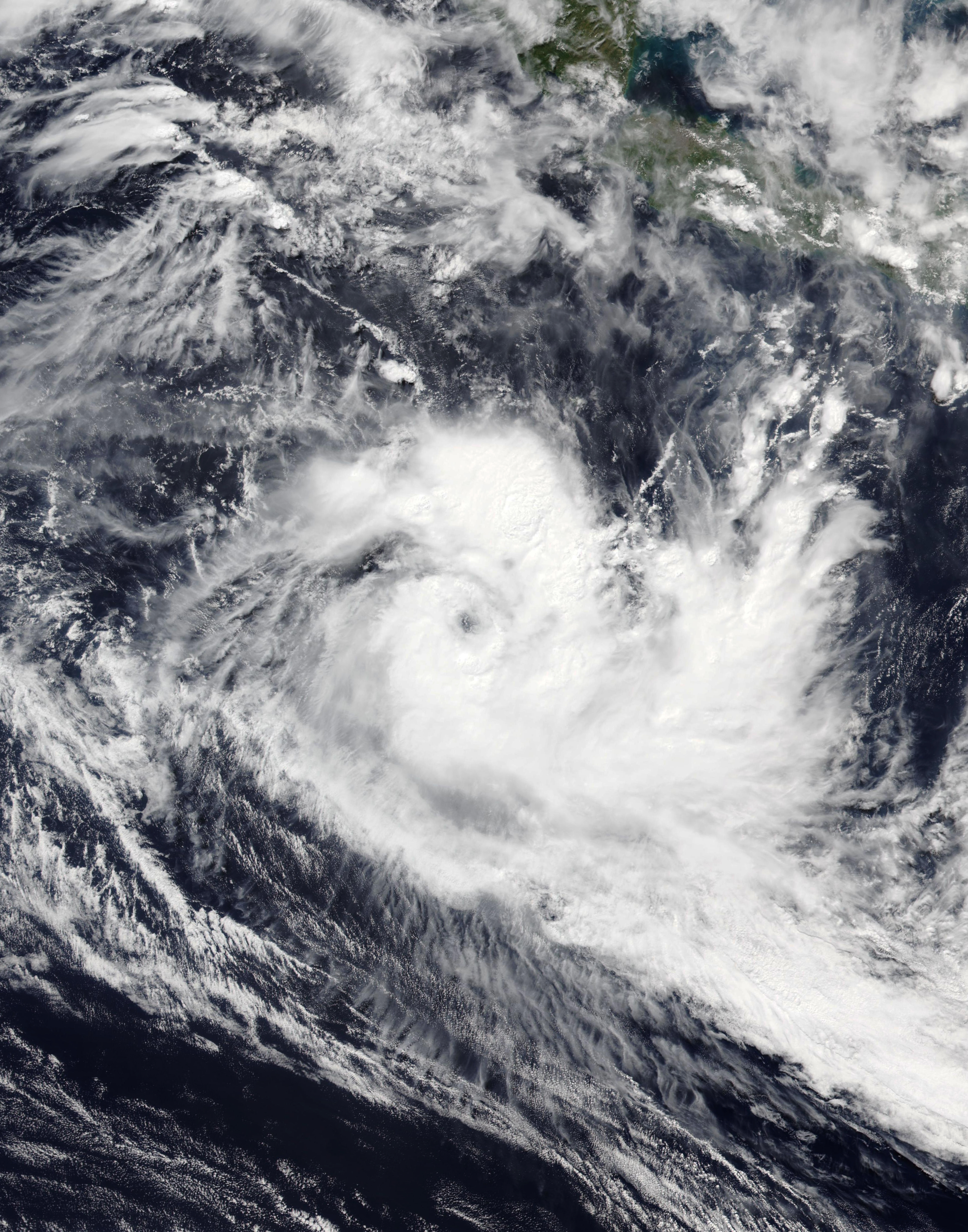
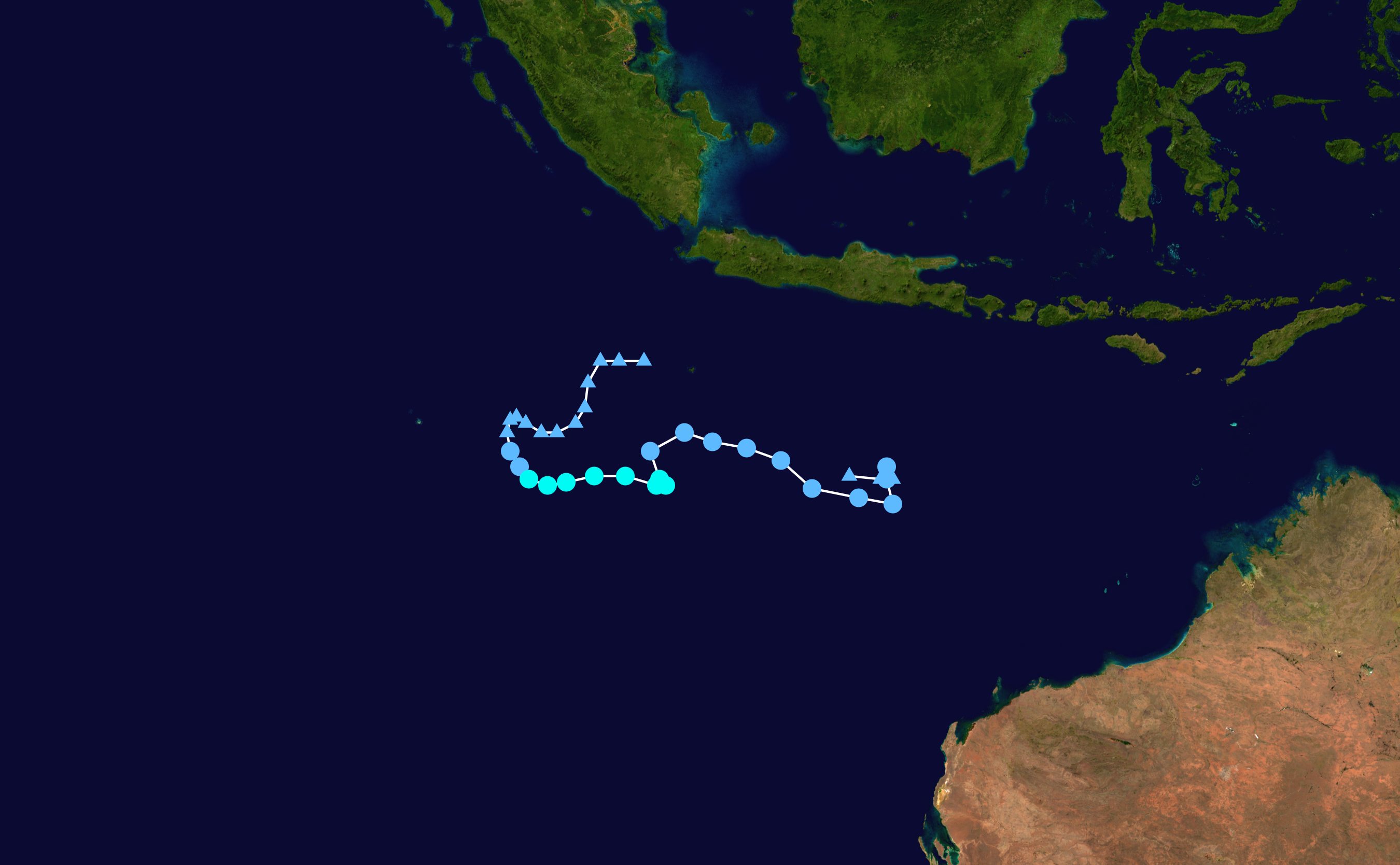
- Duration: 25 April – 29 April
- Peak intensity: 65 km/h (40 mph) (10-min); 998 hPa (mbar)

On 25 April, a new low-level circulation center formed from now-classified Tropical Low 37U and tracked away to the east. The BoM assigned the identifier 34U to the system. This low dissipated on 29 April. The system was upgraded to a tropical storm by the JTWC in post-analysis.

=== Tropical Cyclone Karim ===
- Category 2 tropical cyclone (Australian scale)
- Tropical storm (SSHWS)
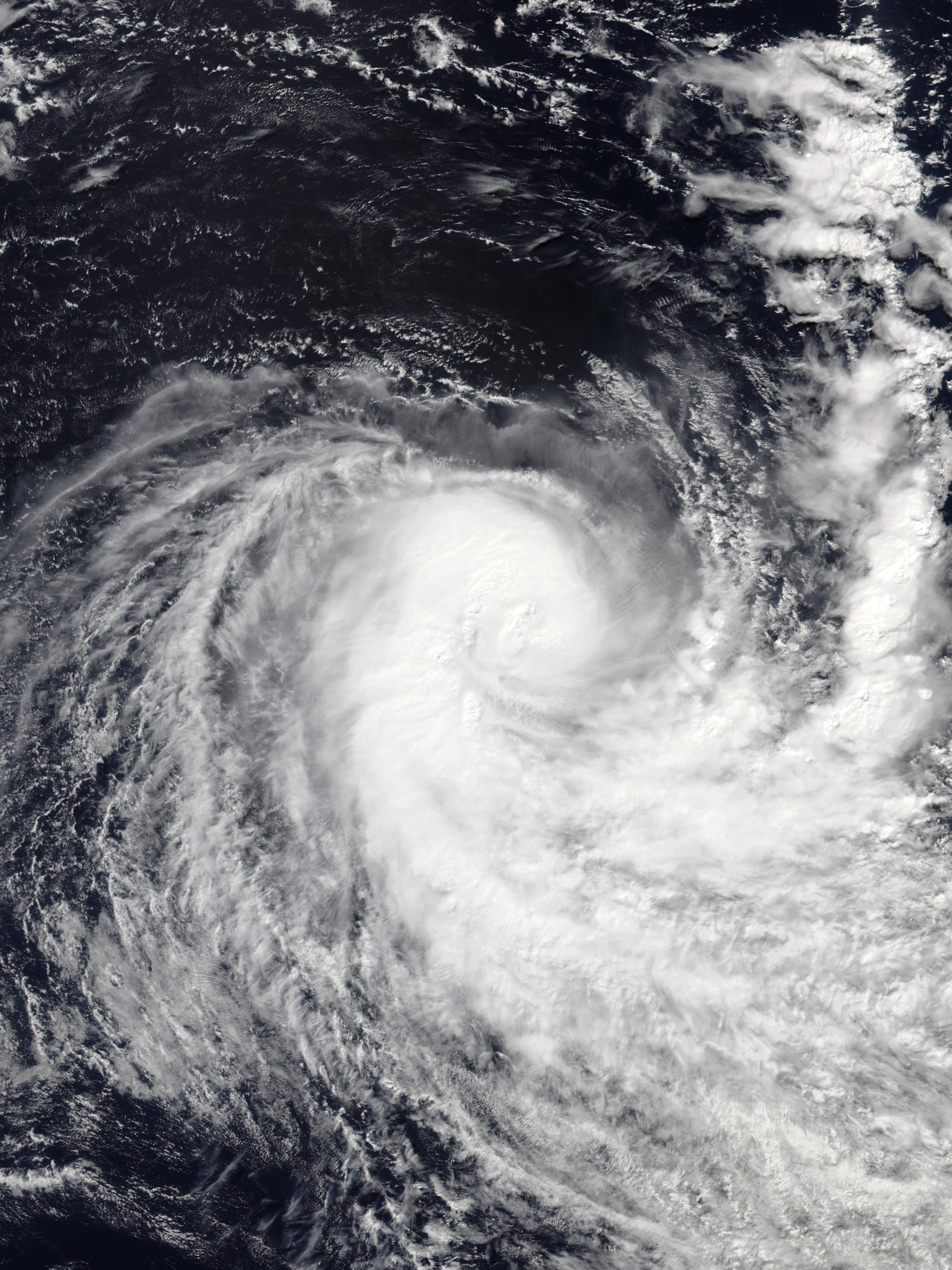
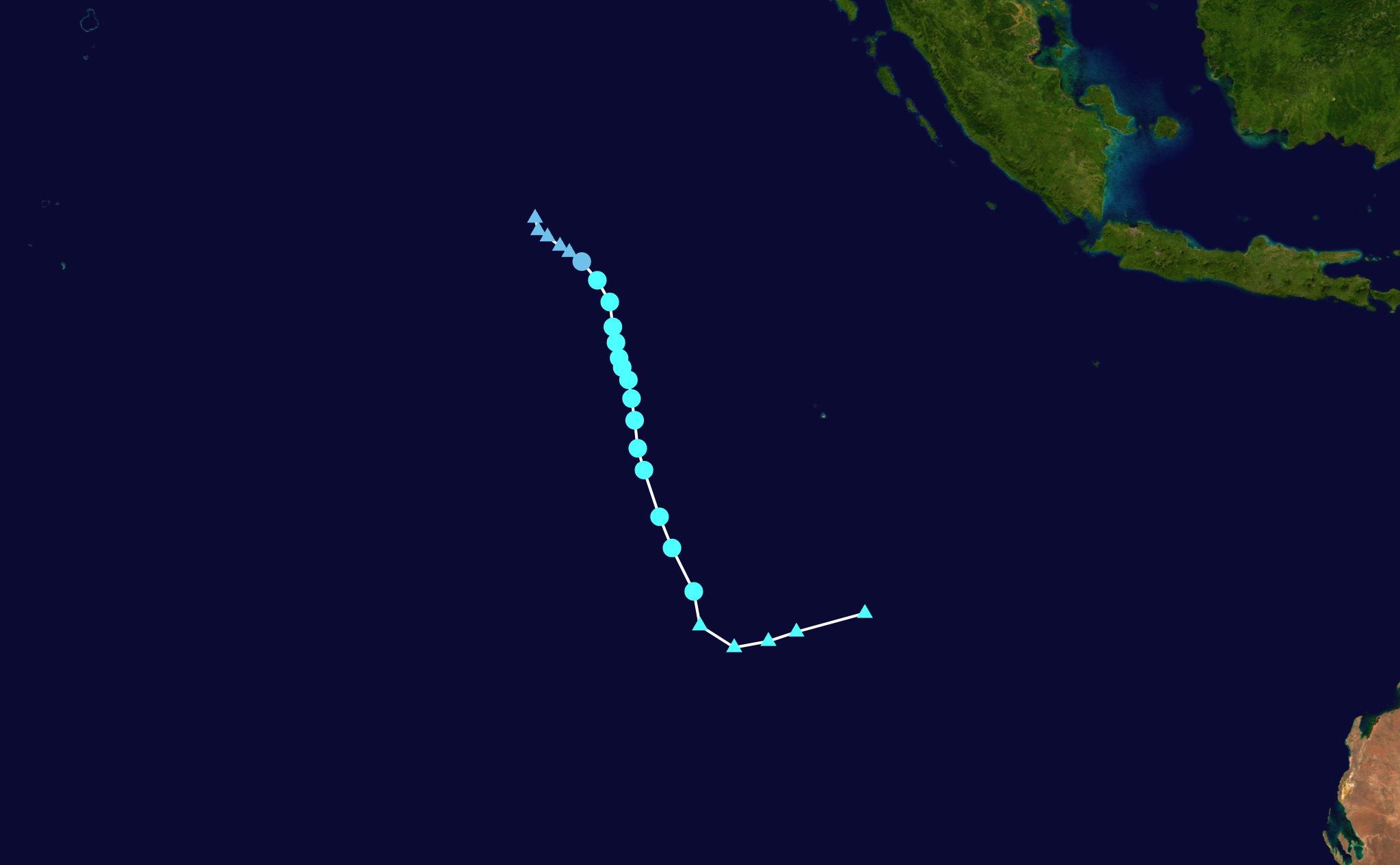
- Duration: 7 May (Entered basin) – 11 May
- Peak intensity: 110 km/h (70 mph) (10-min); 982 hPa (mbar)

On 7 May, Moderate Tropical Storm Karim entered the Australian region, and the BoM initiated advisories on the system as a Category 1 tropical cyclone on the Australian scale. At the time, the system was intensifying, with deep central convection wrapping into the system. By the next day, Karim further intensified into a category 2 tropical cyclone. Late on the same day, the JTWC reported the system had reached its peak intensity. As it moved steadily southwards within an environment of warm sea surface temperatures, moderate wind shear and strong poleward outflow, Karim maintained its intensity throughout 9 May, before the BoM reported that Karim reached its peak intensity by the next day, with 10-minute sustained winds of 60 kn (110 km/h; 69 mph). The storm then started to weaken, as it turned south-southeastwards under the influence of a near-equatorial ridge to the northwest, into an unfavorable environment of cooler sea surface temperatures and high wind shear. By 11 May, the BoM reclassified Karim as a subtropical low. The JTWC subsequently issued their final advisory on the system as it was transitioning to an extratropical cyclone.

=== Other systems ===
The BoM first noted the formation of a possible low-pressure system to the southwest of the island of Sumatra by 4 November. This forecast was materialized when the bureau started to track a weak tropical low outside the Western Region on 9 November, while located at 400 kilometres (250 mi) to the north-northeast of the Cocos Islands. It then entered the region by the next day while tracking slowly towards the island. Environmental conditions were analyzed to be unfavorable for further development and as such, the BoM only forecast a "very low" chance of the low becoming a tropical cyclone. The tropical low then passed to the south of the archipelago before turning westwards and exiting the basin into the South-West Indian Ocean region by 14 November.

On 26 December, a weak tropical low formed close to the Cocos Islands. It meandered over the same area and dissipated on 3 January.

On 22 January, a weak tropical low formed north of the Timor Sea. It was moving east before it changed to west. The system was last noted on 25 January.

On 23 January, the BoM reported that a tropical low had formed in the northwestern portion of the basin. The system moved in a westward direction until it was last tracked on 25 January, when it had exited the basin and moved into the South-West Indian Ocean. At its peak intensity in the Australian region, the BoM estimated the system's minimum atmospheric pressure as 1003 hPa. The MFR began tracking the system, with the system intensifying into Moderate Tropical Storm Batsirai on 27 January.

On 28 May, the BoM reported that a tropical low formed to the southwest of Christmas Island. The JTWC classified the disturbance as a subtropical cyclone in an unofficial bulletin and called it Invest 92S the next day. On 30 May, the agency issued a short bulletin warning that the cyclone could directly hit the region of Pilbara in the west of the country. However, the low started to weaken, and the BoM last noted the low on the next day.

== Storm names ==
=== Bureau of Meteorology ===
The Australian Bureau of Meteorology (TCWC Melbourne) monitors all tropical cyclones that form within the Australian region, including any within the areas of responsibility of TCWC Jakarta or TCWC Port Moresby. Should a tropical low reach tropical cyclone strength within the BoM's area of responsibility, it will be assigned the next name from the following naming list. The names that was used for 2021–22 season is listed below:

- Paddy
- Ruby
- Seth
- Tiffany
- Vernon
- Anika
- Billy
- Charlotte

=== TCWC Jakarta ===
TCWC Jakarta monitors all tropical cyclones active from the Equator to 11S and from 90E to 145E. Should a tropical depression intensify into a tropical cyclone within TCWC Jakarta's Area of Responsibility, it will be assigned the next name from the following list. The name that was used for 2021–22 season is listed below:

- Teratai

=== TCWC Port Moresby ===
Tropical cyclones that develop north of 11°S between 151°E and 160°E are assigned names by the Tropical Cyclone Warning Centre in Port Moresby, Papua New Guinea. Tropical cyclone formation in this area is rare, with no cyclones being named in it since 2007. As names are assigned in a random order, the whole list is shown below:

- Hibu (unused)
- Ila (unused)
- Kama (unused)
- Lobu (unused)
- Maila (unused)
- Alu (unused)
- Buri (unused)
- Dodo (unused)
- Emau (unused)
- Fere (unused)

=== Tropical cyclones from other basins ===
If a tropical cyclone enters the Australian basin from the Southwest Indian region basin (east of 90°E), it will retain the name assigned to it by the Météo-France (MFR). The following storms were named in this manner:

- Karim

=== Retirement ===
Later in 2022, the Bureau of Meteorology retired the name Seth, replacing it with Stafford due to the damage caused by it in Queensland.

== Season effects ==
2021–22 Australian region cyclone season
Name	Dates active	Peak intensity			Areas affected	Damage (US$)	Deaths	Refs
Name	Dates active	Category	Wind speed	Pressure	Areas affected	Damage (US$)	Deaths	Refs
TL	November 9 – 14	Tropical low	Not specified	1006 hPa (29.71 inHg)	None	None	None	
Paddy	November 17 – 23	Category 1 tropical cyclone	75 km/h (45 mph)	994 hPa (29.35 inHg)	Christmas Island	None	None	
03U	November 22 – 28	Tropical low	Not specified	1006 hPa (29.71 inHg)	None	None	None	
Teratai	November 28 – December 11	Category 1 tropical cyclone	75 km/h (45 mph)	996 hPa (29.41 inHg)	Christmas Island	None	None	
Ruby	December 9 – 13	Category 2 tropical cyclone	110 km/h (70 mph)	980 hPa (28.94 inHg)	Solomon Islands, New Caledonia	None	None	
06U	December 13 – 15	Tropical low	Not specified	1007 hPa (29.74 inHg)	None	None	None	
Seth	December 23, 2021 – January 1, 2022	Category 2 tropical cyclone	100 km/h (65 mph)	982 hPa (29.00 inHg)	Northern Territory, Queensland	$80 million	4	
TL	December 26, 2021 – January 3, 2022	Tropical low	Not specified	Not specified	None	None	None	
Tiffany	January 8 – 12	Category 2 tropical cyclone	100 km/h (65 mph)	988 hPa (29.18 inHg)	Queensland, Northern Territory	$36,000	7	
11U	January 13 – 14	Tropical low	Not specified	1008 hPa (29.77 inHg)	None	None	None	
TL	January 22 – 25	Tropical low	Not specified	1005 hPa (29.68 inHg)	None	None	None	
Batsirai	January 23 – 25	Tropical low	Not specified	1003 hPa (29.62 inHg)	None	None	None	
14U	January 28 – February 5	Tropical low	Not specified	1003 hPa (29.62 inHg)	Western Australia	Unknown	None	
16U	January 29 – February 3	Tropical low	65 km/h (40 mph)	995 hPa (29.38 inHg)	None	None	None	
17U	February 5 – 14	Tropical low	Not specified	1001 hPa (29.56 inHg)	None	None	None	
19U (Fezile)	February 13 – 16	Tropical low	55 km/h (35 mph)	999 hPa (29.50 inHg)	None	None	None	
20U	February 17 – 18	Tropical low	Not specified	1003 hPa (29.62 inHg)	None	None	None	
Vernon	February 23 – 26	Category 4 severe tropical cyclone	185 km/h (115 mph)	950 hPa (28.05 inHg)	None	None	None	
21U	February 24 – 27	Tropical low	Not specified	1001 hPa (29.56 inHg)	Northern Queensland	None	None	
Anika	February 24 – March 3	Category 2 tropical cyclone	95 km/h (60 mph)	978 hPa (28.88 inHg)	Northern Territory, Western Australia	Unknown	None	
25U	February 26 – 27	Tropical low	85 km/h (50 mph)	996 hPa (29.41 inHg)	None	None	None	
26U	February 27 – March 4	Tropical low	Not specified	1004 hPa (29.65 inHg)	None	None	None	
Billy	March 12 – 16	Category 2 tropical cyclone	95 km/h (60 mph)	988 hPa (29.18 inHg)	None	None	None	
Charlotte	March 16 – 23	Category 4 severe tropical cyclone	165 km/h (105 mph)	956 hPa (28.23 inHg)	Lesser Sunda Islands	None	None	
30U	March 30 – April 1	Tropical low	45 km/h (30 mph)	1004 hPa (29.65 inHg)	None	None	None	
32U	April 8 – 9	Tropical low	Not specified	1005 hPa (29.68 inHg)	None	None	None	
33U	April 17 – 19	Tropical low	45 km/h (30 mph)	1005 hPa (29.68 inHg)	Northern Territory	None	None	
37U	April 24 – 26	Tropical low	75 km/h (45 mph)	996 hPa (29.41 inHg)	None	None	None	
34U	April 25 – 29	Tropical low	65 km/h (40 mph)	998 hPa (29.47 inHg)	None	None	None	
Karim	May 7 – 11	Category 2 tropical cyclone	110 km/h (70 mph)	982 hPa (29.00 inHg)	None	None	None	
TL	May 28 – 31	Tropical low	Not specified	1004 hPa (29.65 inHg)	Christmas Island, Western Australia	None	None	
Season aggregates
31 systems	November 9, 2021 – May 31, 2022		185 km/h (115 mph)	950 hPa (28.05 inHg)		$80 million	11	

== See also ==
- Weather of 2021 and 2022
- List of Southern Hemisphere cyclone seasons
- List of off-season Australian region tropical cyclones
- Tropical cyclones in 2021, 2022
- Atlantic hurricane seasons: 2021, 2022
- Pacific hurricane seasons: 2021, 2022
- Pacific typhoon seasons: 2021, 2022
- North Indian Ocean cyclone seasons: 2021, 2022
- 2021–22 South-West Indian Ocean cyclone season
- 2021–22 South Pacific cyclone season
