= 2022 Atlantic hurricane season =

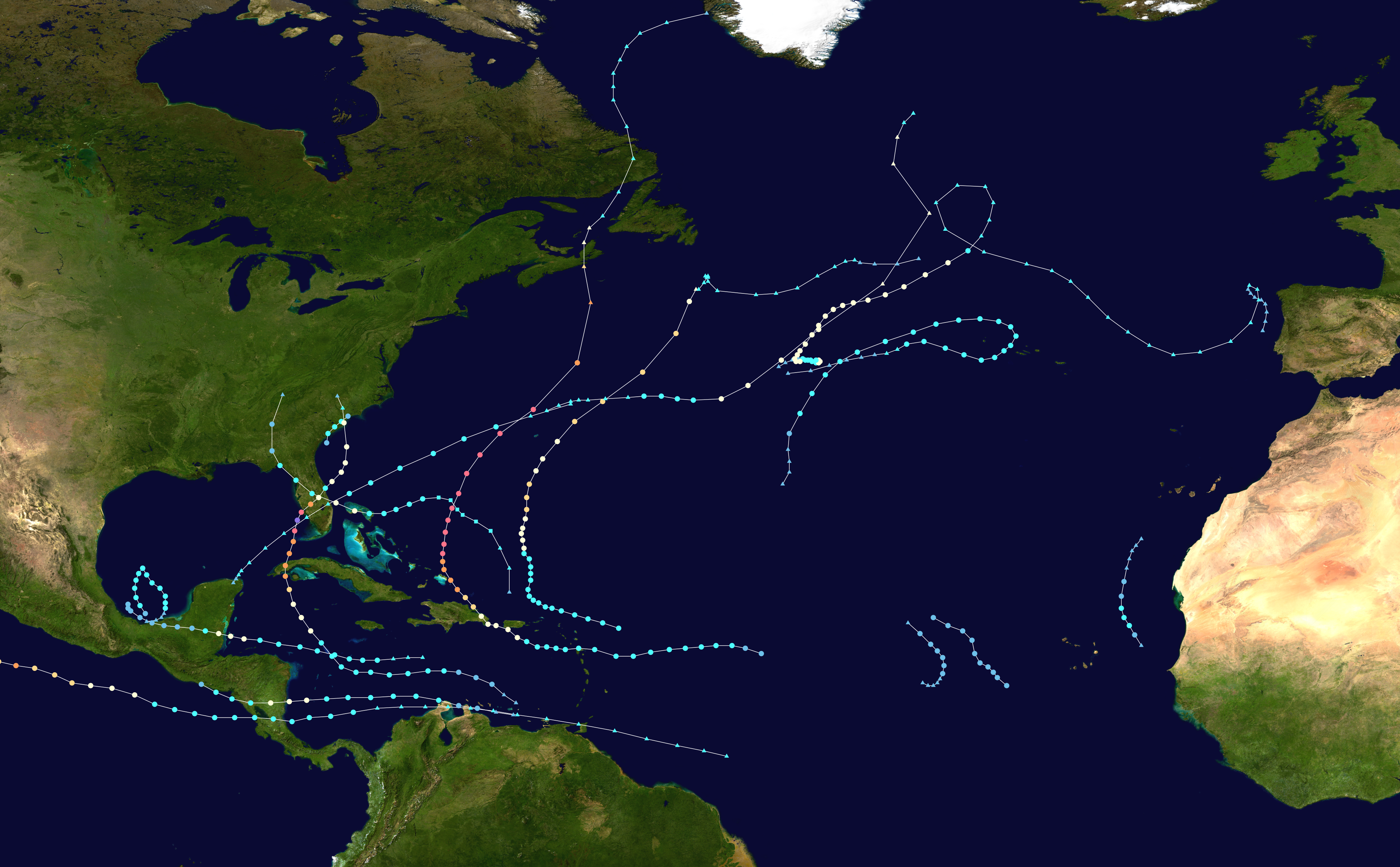
- Season summary map

Seasonal boundaries
- First system formed: June 5, 2022
- Last system dissipated: November 11, 2022

Strongest storm
- By maximum sustained winds: Ian
  - Maximum winds: 160 mph (260 km/h) (1-minute sustained)
  - Lowest pressure: 937 mbar (hPa; 27.67 inHg)
- By central pressure: Fiona
  - Maximum winds: 140 mph (220 km/h) (1-minute sustained)
  - Lowest pressure: 931 mbar (hPa; 27.49 inHg)

Seasonal statistics
- Total depressions: 16
- Total storms: 14
- Hurricanes: 8
- Major hurricanes (Cat. 3+): 2
- ACE: 94.6
- Total fatalities: 305 total
- Total damage: > $118 billion (2022 USD) (Fourth-costliest tropical cyclone season on record)

Related articles
- Timeline of the 2022 Atlantic hurricane season; 2022 Pacific hurricane season; 2022 Pacific typhoon season; 2022 North Indian Ocean cyclone season

The 2022 Atlantic hurricane season was a near-average yet destructive Atlantic hurricane season. Despite having an average number of named storms and a below average amount of major hurricanes, (Note: According to the National Oceanic and Atmospheric Administration (NOAA), the long-term (1991-2020) seasonal averages are: 14 named storms, 7 hurricanes, and 3 major hurricanes.) it became the fourth-costliest Atlantic hurricane season on record, behind only 2024, 2005, and 2017, mostly due to Hurricane Ian. The season officially began on June 1, and ended on November 30. These dates, adopted by convention, historically describe the period in each year when most subtropical or tropical cyclogenesis occurs in the Atlantic Ocean. This year's first Atlantic named storm, Tropical Storm Alex, developed four days after the start of the season, making this the first season since 2014 not to have a pre-season named storm.

Two systems developed on July 1. Tropical Storm Bonnie formed and made landfall near the Costa Rica–Nicaragua border. It then crossed over into the Pacific basin, becoming the first to survive the crossover from the Atlantic to the Pacific since Hurricane Otto in 2016. Also, Tropical Storm Colin formed abruptly and made landfall in South Carolina, before quickly weakening and dissipating the next day. Following this activity, tropical cyclogenesis was suppressed across the basin for several weeks by a combination of increased wind shear and the presence of the Saharan Air Layer. This stopped all tropical cyclogenesis in August, the first season to do so since 1997, and the first during a La Niña. This pause in activity lasted sixty days, ending when hurricanes Danielle and Earl formed on September 1 and 3 respectively. Danielle become the season's first hurricane; the last season to have its first hurricane develop this late was 2013.

Activity then increased tremendously towards the end of September as four named storms formed in quick succession. Among them, Hurricane Fiona became the season's first major hurricane on September 20, which is about three weeks later than when the first one typically forms. As an extratropical cyclone it became the strongest storm in Canadian history, as measured by atmospheric pressure, and caused significant damage in Atlantic Canada. Hurricane Ian then became the second major hurricane of the season on September 27 and the only Category 5 of the season on September 28 and inflicted an estimated $113.1 billion in damage to western Cuba, Southwestern and Central Florida, and the Carolinas. Hurricane Julia formed in early October and became the second storm of the season to cross over into the Pacific basin intact after traversing Nicaragua, making this season the first to have more than one crossover system since 1996. The last storm in the season, Hurricane Nicole, made landfall on the coasts of the Bahamas and Florida. It was the first November hurricane to make landfall in Florida since Kate in 1985, and caused about $1 billion in damage in areas devastated by Ian six weeks earlier. Tropical cyclones during this season collectively caused at least 304 deaths and more than $117.7 billion in damage, making it one of the costliest seasons on record.

Most forecasting agencies anticipated a well-above average season due to warmer-than-normal sea surface temperatures and a favorable El Niño–Southern Oscillation pattern, limiting the chances of El Niño developing. While conducive conditions such as warmer sea surface temperatures and a La Niña came to fruition, the unfavorable wind shear pattern with drier air and Saharan Air Layer suppressed tropical cyclogenesis through most of July and the entirety of August, with the latter typically being among the most active climatologically.

== Seasonal forecasts ==
Predictions of tropical activity in the 2022 season
| Source | Date | Named storms | Hurricanes | Major hurricanes | Ref |
| Average (1991–2020) | | 14.4 | 7.2 | 3.2 |
| Record high activity | | 30 | 15 | 7† |
| Record low activity | | 1 | 0† | 0† |
| CSU | December 9, 2021 | 13–16 | 6–8 | 2–3 |
| TSR | December 10, 2021 | 18 | 8 | 3 |
| TSR | April 6, 2022 | 18 | 8 | 4 |
| CSU | April 7, 2022 | 19 | 9 | 4 |
| TWC | April 14, 2022 | 20 | 8 | 4 |
| UA | April 14, 2022 | 14 | 7 | 3 |
| NCSU | April 20, 2022 | 17–21 | 7–9 | 3–5 |
| PSU | May 9, 2022 | 11–19 | N/A | N/A |
| UKMO* | May 23, 2022 | 18 | 9 | 4 |
| NOAA | May 24, 2022 | 14–21 | 6–10 | 3–6 |
| TSR | May 31, 2022 | 18 | 8 | 4 |
| CSU | June 2, 2022 | 20 | 10 | 5 |
| TWC | June 17, 2022 | 21 | 9 | 4 |
| UA | June 20, 2022 | 15 | 7 | 3 |
| TSR | July 5, 2022 | 18 | 9 | 4 |
| CSU | July 7, 2022 | 20 | 10 | 5 |
| UKMO | August 2, 2022 | 16 | 6 | 4 |
| NOAA | August 4, 2022 | 14–20 | 6–10 | 3–5 |
| CSU | August 4, 2022 | 18 | 8 | 4 |
| TWC | August 18, 2022 | 17 | 7 | 3 |
| | Actual activity | 14 | 8 | 2 |
* June–November only † Most recent of several such occurrences. (See all)

In advance of, and during, each hurricane season, several forecasts of hurricane activity are issued by national meteorological services, scientific agencies, and noted hurricane experts. These include forecasters from the United States National Oceanic and Atmospheric Administration (NOAA)'s Climate Prediction Center, Tropical Storm Risk (TSR), the United Kingdom's Met Office (UKMO), and Philip J. Klotzbach and their associates at Colorado State University (CSU). The forecasts include weekly and monthly changes in significant factors that help determine the number of tropical storms, hurricanes, and major hurricanes within a particular year. According to NOAA and CSU, the average Atlantic hurricane season between 1991 and 2020 contained roughly 14 tropical storms, seven hurricanes, three major hurricanes, and an accumulated cyclone energy (ACE) index of 74–126 units. Broadly speaking, ACE is a measure of the power of a tropical or subtropical storm multiplied by the length of time it existed. It is only calculated for full advisories on specific tropical and subtropical systems reaching or exceeding wind speeds of 39 mph (63 km/h). NOAA typically categorizes a season as above-average, average, or below-average based on the cumulative ACE index, but the number of tropical storms, hurricanes, and major hurricanes within a hurricane season is sometimes also considered.

=== Pre-season forecasts ===
On December 9, 2021, CSU issued an extended-range forecast for the 2022 hurricane season, giving a 40% chance of near-average activity with 13–16 named storms, 6–8 hurricanes, 2–3 major hurricanes, and an ACE index of about 130 units. The forecast also gave a 25% chance that the ACE Index would end up being around 170 units, and a 25% likelihood the likelihood that the index would end up around 80. TSR also issued an extended-range forecast on December 10, 2021. It predicted overall near-average tropical activity with its ACE index, anticipating 18 tropical storms, 8 hurricanes, and 3 intense hurricanes to form during the season. One of their factors was the expectation of a neutral El Niño-Southern Oscillation condition by the third quarter of 2022. This outlook had "large uncertainties".

In their April 6, 2022, forecast, TSR's number of named storms remained unchanged, while they slightly increased the number of major hurricane from three to four. On the following day, CSU issued their first extended-range seasonal forecast for the 2022 Atlantic hurricane season, predicting well-above-average activity, with 19 named storms, 9 hurricanes, 4 major hurricanes, and an ACE index of 160 units. Their factors supporting an active hurricane season included above average-sea surface temperatures in the subtropical Atlantic Ocean and Caribbean Sea, and a cool neutral ENSO or weak La Niña pattern, corresponding to a low chance of an El Niño. The Weather Channel (TWC) issued their first seasonal forecast on April 14, calling for 20 named storms, 8 hurricanes, and 4 major hurricanes. On the same day, the University of Arizona (UA) issued its seasonal prediction for a slightly above-average hurricane season, with 14 named storms, 7 hurricanes, 3 major hurricanes, and an ACE index of 129 units. North Carolina State University (NCSU) made its prediction for the season on April 20, calling for an above-average season with 17 to 21 named storms, 7 to 9 hurricanes, and 3 to 5 major hurricanes.

On May 9, Pennsylvania State University predicted 14.9 +/- 3.8 tropical storms, or a range of 11 to 19 named storms. On May 23, UKMO issued their own forecast for the 2022 season, predicting an above-average season with 18 named storms, 9 hurricanes, and 4 major hurricanes, with a 70% chance that each of these statistics will fall between 13 and 23, 6 and 12, and 2 and 6, respectively. The following day, NOAA's Climate Prediction Center issued their forecasts for the season, predicting a 65% chance of above-average activity and 25% chance for below-average activity, with 14–21 named storms, 6–10 hurricanes, and 3–6 major hurricanes. TSR released another prediction on May 31 that was unchanged from its April 6 forecast: 18 named storms, 8 hurricanes, and 4 major hurricanes.

=== Mid-season forecasts ===
On June 2, CSU updated their extended-range seasonal forecast, increasing the amount of tropical cyclones to 20 named storms, 10 hurricanes, 5 major hurricanes, and an overall ACE index of 180 units. This was done after a later analysis of the lower chances of an El Niño during the season, as well as a warmer-than-average tropical Atlantic. TWC's second outlook, released on June 17, slightly increased the number of named storms to 21 and hurricanes to 9, but left the number of major hurricanes at 4. On June 20, 2022, UA updated its seasonal prediction, which is very similar to its April prediction, with 15 named storms, 7 hurricanes, 3 major hurricanes, and an ACE index of 131 units. On July 5, TSR released their third forecast for the season, slightly increasing their numbers to 18 named storms, 9 hurricanes, and 4 major hurricanes. This prediction was largely based on the persistence of the weak La Niña into the third quarter of the year. On July 7, CSU did not make changes to their updated prediction of 20 named storms, 10 hurricanes, and 5 major hurricanes. UKMO's updated forecast on August 2 called for 16 named storms, 6 hurricanes, and 4 major hurricanes. Two days later, NOAA and CSU each revised their activity outlook slightly downward, though both still predicted that the season would end up being busier than the 30-year average. The revisions were made in part because of the relative slow start to the season (as compared to the past few years), with only three short-lived named storms as of the start of August. The third and final TWC seasonal forecast, issued on August 18, decreased the number of named storms to 17, hurricanes to 7, and major hurricanes to 3.

== Seasonal summary ==
=== Background ===
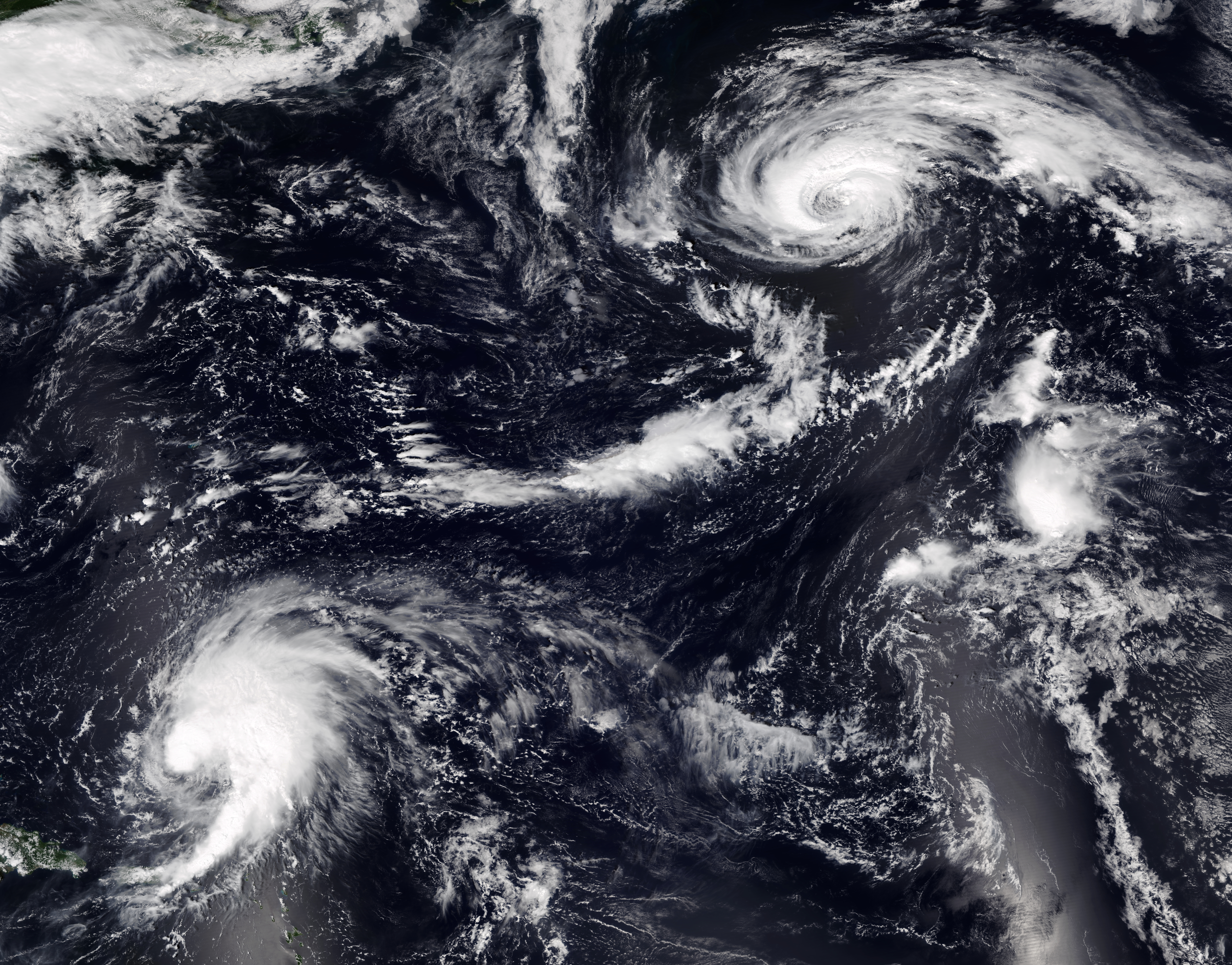
Tropical Storm Earl (bottom left) and Hurricane Danielle (top right) on September 5

Officially, the 2022 Atlantic hurricane season ran from June 1 to November 30. A total of 16 tropical cyclones developed, 14 of which intensified into named storms. Of those, eight strengthened into a hurricane, while two systems reached major hurricane intensity. Thus, the season was near-average compared to NOAA's 1991–2020 mean of 14 named storms, 7 hurricanes, and 3 major hurricanes. The near-average number of named storms ended the record six-year streak of above-average activity in the Atlantic. A strong La Niña and slightly above-normal West African Monsoon season led to the mostly average activity. However, intense wind shear and the suppression of moisture in the atmosphere by the Saharan Air Layer led to an unusual mid-season cessation in tropical cyclogenesis that lasted nearly two months, with no named storms in the Atlantic between July 3 and August 31 for the first time since 1941.

Hurricanes Fiona and Ian inflicted historically significant impacts on certain areas. After Fiona caused a few billion dollars in damage in Puerto Rico, its remnants struck Nova Scotia as a powerful extratropical cyclone, becoming the costliest weather disaster on record in Atlantic Canada. Ian became both the costliest Florida hurricane and the third-costliest on record in the United States, behind only Hurricane Katrina in 2005 and Hurricane Harvey in 2017. Additionally, 150 fatalities occurred in Florida, making Ian the deadliest tropical cyclone in the state since the 1935 Labor Day hurricane. Collectively, the tropical cyclones of the 2022 Atlantic hurricane season caused at least 304 fatalities and more than $117.708 billion in damage, making it one of the costliest seasons of all time.

This season's ACE index was approximately 94.6 units, which was 77% of the long-term (30-year) average of 123. This was the first season since 2007 to have an ACE value that is near-average. All seasons from 2008 to 2021 were either below or above-average.

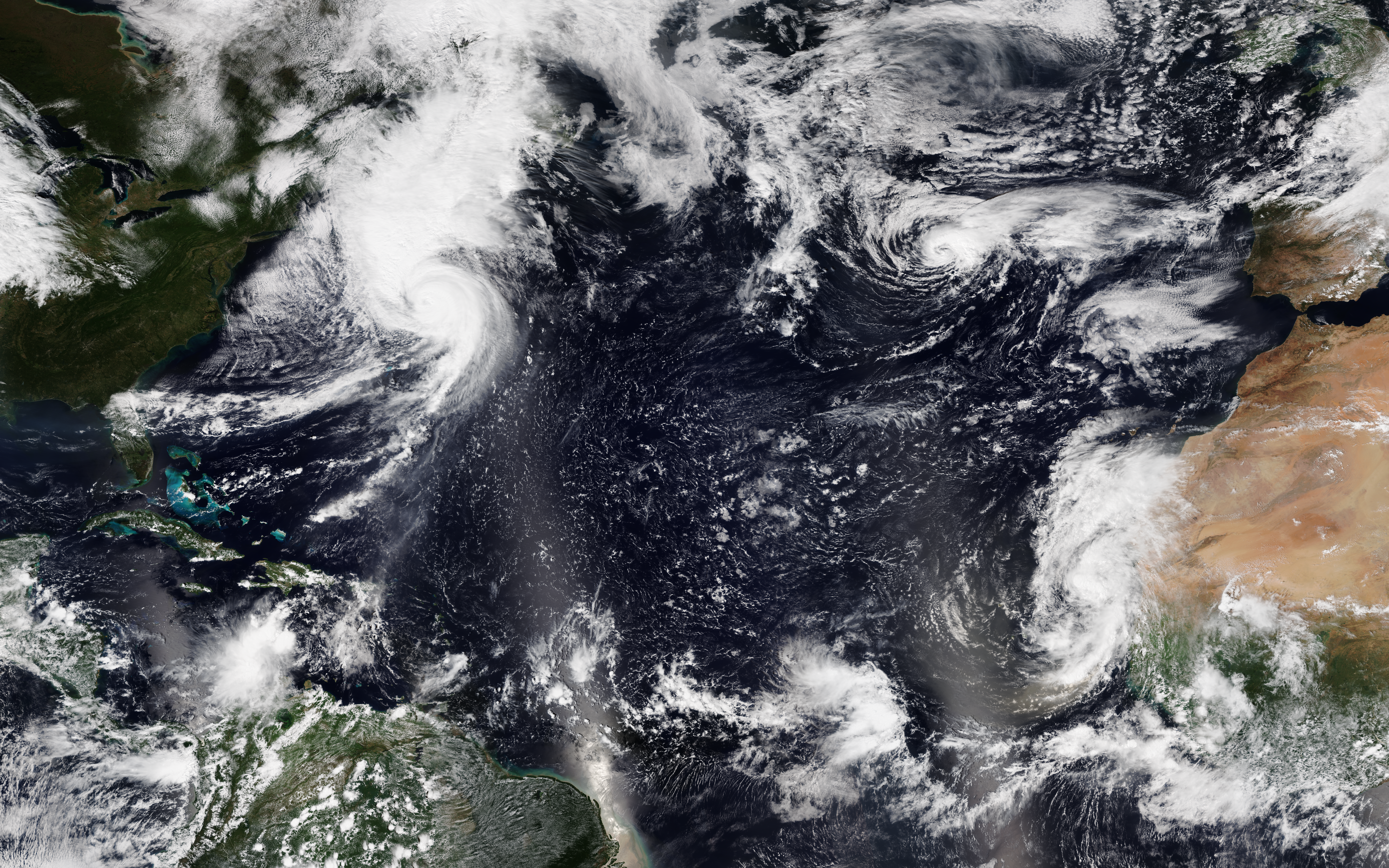
Four tropical cyclones active simultaneously on September 23: Hurricane Fiona (top-left), Tropical Storm Gaston (top-right), Tropical Storm Hermine (bottom-right), and Tropical Depression Nine (bottom-left, which ultimately became Hurricane Ian). The wave that would later spawn Tropical Depression Eleven can be seen to the left of Hermine.

Overall, NOAA Hurricane Hunters logged more than 582 flight hours while conducting 65 eyewall passages and deploying more than 1,700 scientific instruments, including dropsondes. Additionally, the Gulfstream IV-SP took off from the Cabo Verde Islands in August, becoming the easternmost hurricane hunter flight. NOAA also launched an Altius-600 for the first time, which recorded wind speed data on Hurricane Ian as it approached landfall in Florida. Crews of flights conducted by the National Ocean Service took thousands of aerial images of the destruction caused by Ian, which especially assisted with identifying pollutants and areas requiring extensive marine debris cleanup. NOAA's King Air and Twin Otter aircraft were also involved in a similar mission in the aftermath of Ian and Hurricane Nicole, logging more than 41 flight hours.

=== Early season activity ===
The 2022 season was the first since 2014 to not have a pre-season named storm. Activity began with the formation of Tropical Storm Alex on June 5, after several days of slow development while traversing the Gulf of Mexico and then moving over Central Florida. The storm peaked at near-hurricane strength before becoming extratropical on the following day over the Central North Atlantic. On July 1, Tropical Storm Bonnie formed in the Southern Caribbean Sea and made landfall shortly thereafter near the Costa Rica–Nicaragua border. It then crossed over into the Pacific basin a day later, the first storm to do so since Hurricane Otto in 2016, where it would become a Category 3 hurricane. Also on July 1, a low-pressure system off the U.S. Atlantic coast near Savannah, Georgia, abruptly organized into Tropical Storm Colin, a short-lived storm that dissipated the next day inland over northeastern South Carolina. Tropical cyclogenesis then ceased for almost two months, with 2022 becoming the first season since 1997 in which no tropical cyclones formed in August. A disturbance over the Gulf of Mexico was briefly designated as a potential tropical cyclone during the month, but it did not organize into a tropical cyclone before moving inland over Northeastern Mexico.

=== Peak to late season activity ===
List of costliest Atlantic hurricane seasons (as of 2026)
| Rank | Cost | Season |
|---|---|---|
| 1 | ≥ $294.811 billion | 2017 |
| 2 | $179.253 billion | 2005 |
| 3 | $131 billion | 2024 |
| 4 | $118 billion | 2022 |
| 5 | ≥ $80.78 billion | 2021 |
| 6 | $72.34 billion | 2012 |
| 7 | $60.4 billion | 2004 |
| 8 | $54.336 billion | 2020 |
| 9 | ≥ $50.526 billion | 2018 |
| 10 | ≥ $49.53 billion | 2008 |

Tropical activity ultimately resumed with the formation of Tropical Storm Danielle over the central Atlantic on September 1. The storm intensified into a hurricane the following day, the latest first hurricane since 2013. It remained nearly stationary far to the west of the Azores for several days before moving northeastward and becoming extratropical on September 8 without affecting any land areas. Additionally, a slow-developing disturbance east of the Lesser Antilles became organized and developed into Tropical Storm Earl late on September 2. It strengthened into a hurricane, tracked east of Bermuda, fluctuating between Category 1 and 2 intensity, and then became extratropical near Newfoundland on September 10. Four days later, Tropical Storm Fiona formed in the Central Atlantic. Fiona eventually became a hurricane, striking both Puerto Rico and the Dominican Republic before becoming the season's first major hurricane as it passed by the Turks and Caicos Islands on September 20. That same day, Tropical Storm Gaston formed over the Central Atlantic and moved through the Western Azores. Fiona strengthened into a Category 4 hurricane as it passed west of Bermuda and transitioned into a powerful extratropical cyclone on September 23, just before striking Nova Scotia. That same day, Tropical Depression Nine formed in the Caribbean Sea and Tropical Depression Ten formed in the eastern tropical Atlantic, marking the first time since 2020 that four tropical cyclones were active simultaneously in the Atlantic basin.

Tropical Depression Nine became Hurricane Ian, the deadliest and most destructive storm of the season. Ian made landfall in western Cuba and crossed the Florida Keys as a Category 3 hurricane, before briefly becoming a Category 5 hurricane. It then made landfall in southwestern Florida as a high-end Category 4 hurricane, with winds of 150 mph (240 km/h), the strongest storm to hit the area in terms of windspeed. The storm later made landfall in South Carolina as a Category 1. Tropical Depression Ten attained tropical storm strength first, becoming Tropical Storm Hermine. It was one of the easternmost Atlantic tropical storms on record, and brought heavy rainfall to the Canary Islands. Next, Tropical Depression Eleven formed during the last week in September, and then Tropical Depression Twelve formed one week later. Ultimately, neither cyclone strengthened into a tropical storm. Soon thereafter, Hurricane Julia formed just off the coast of Venezuela on October 7. After traversing Nicaragua intact, Julia entered the Pacific basin. Not since 1996 has more than one storm crossed between the Atlantic and Pacific basins intact during a single season. On October 11, Tropical Storm Karl formed in the Bay of Campeche, moved erratically over open waters, before degenerating into a remnant low offshore of Mexico three days later. Hurricane Martin was the second largest Atlantic hurricane on record as measured by diameter, behind only Hurricane Sandy, with tropical-storm-force winds spanning 1,040 miles (1,670 km). Martin and Lisa were both at hurricane strength on November 2, thus, for the first time since Michelle and Noel in 2001, two Atlantic hurricanes were at hurricane strength simultaneously during November. Soon thereafter, Hurricane Nicole formed on November 7, also tying 2001 for the most hurricanes in November, with three. Nicole impacted the Greater Antilles, the Bahamas, and the Eastern United States, becoming the first hurricane to strike Florida in the month of November since Hurricane Kate in 1985. The storm was absorbed by a trough over North Carolina on November 11, ending activity for the season.

== Systems ==
=== Tropical Storm Alex ===
- Tropical storm (SSHWS)
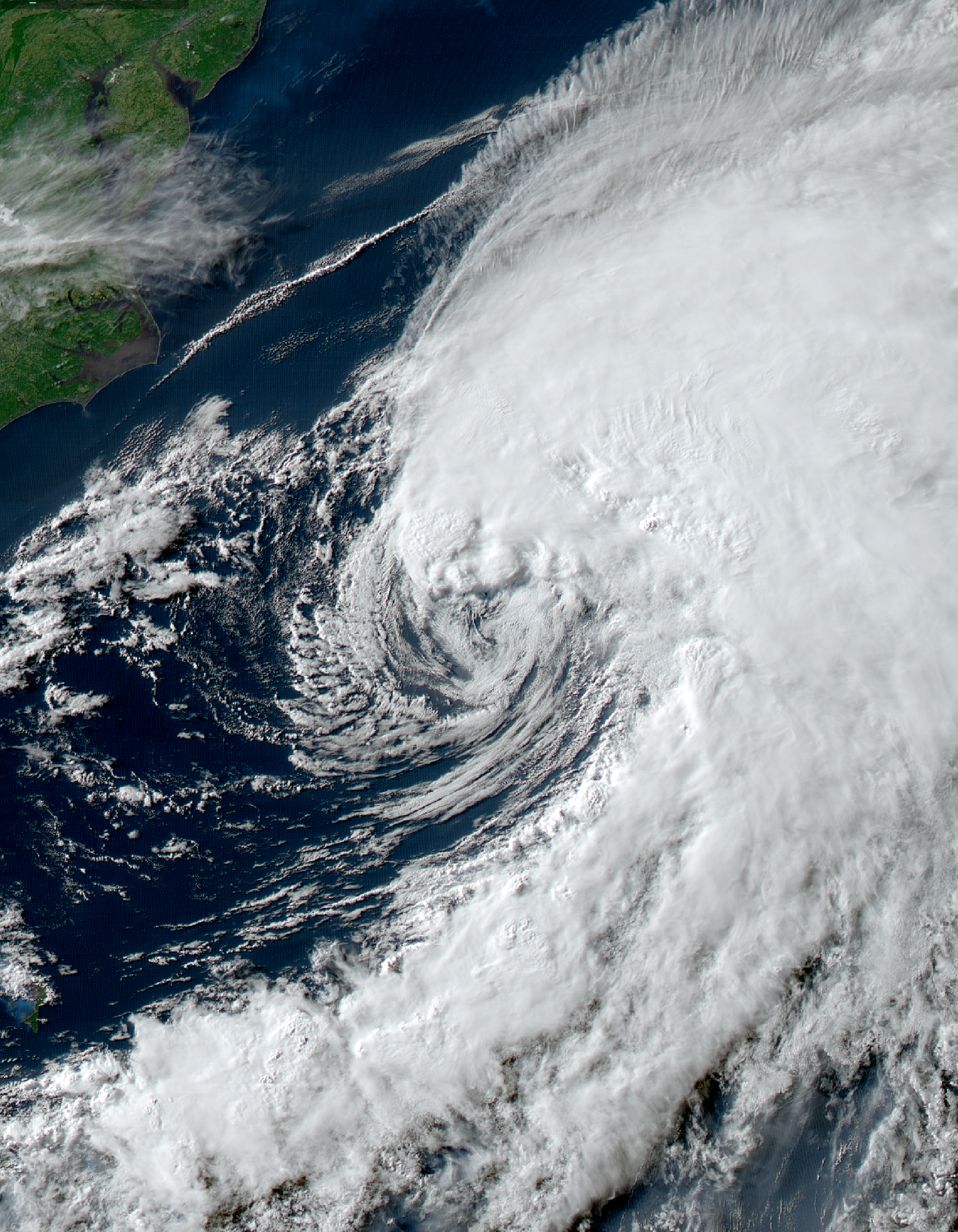
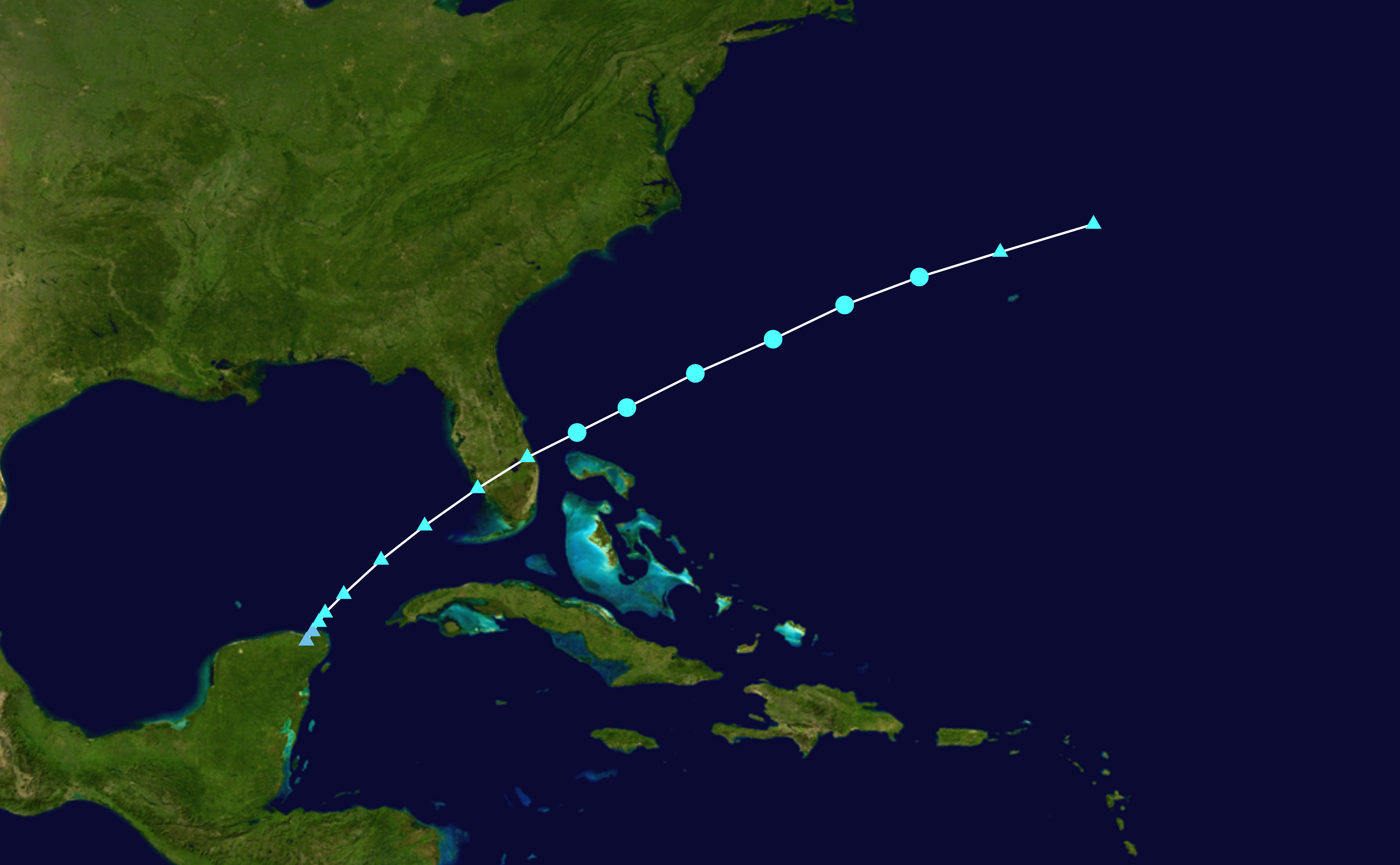
- Duration: June 5 – June 6
- Peak intensity: 70 mph (110 km/h) (1-min); 984 mbar (hPa)

In late May, the mid-level remnants of Hurricane Agatha in the Pacific basin interacted with a Central American Gyre. Consequently, a gradual increase in deep convection occurred over the Yucatán Peninsula and the northwestern Caribbean Sea, which led to the development of a low-pressure area just north of the Belize-Mexico border on June 2. After emerging into the southeastern Gulf of Mexico early the next day, the disturbance made multiple attempts at organizing into a tropical cyclone and attained tropical storm-force winds. However, strong wind shear kept the system disorganized before it struck Southwest Florida on June 4. Several hours later, the disturbance emerged into the Atlantic, where it developed into Tropical Storm Alex at 00:00 UTC on June 5 about 85 mi (135 km) north of Grand Bahama. Additional intensification occurred as Alex moved east-northeastward due to mid-latitude westerly flow, reaching sustained winds of 70 mph (110 km/h) around 18:00 UTC. However, drier air caused Alex to weaken on the following day, with the storm transitioning into an extratropical cyclone at 12:00 UTC roughly 105 mi (170 km) north-northwest of Bermuda. The remnants of Alex were absorbed by a baroclinic zone early on June 7.

Due to the threat the developing system posed to Cuba, the Florida Keys, and South Florida, the National Hurricane Center initiated advisories on it, designating it as Potential Tropical Cyclone One. The precursor to Alex dropped heavy precipitation in these regions. During a 30-hour period on June 2–3, Paso Real de San Diego in the province of Pinar del Río recorded about 12 inches (301 mm) of rain, and Playa Girón in Matanzas received over 8 inches (193 mm). There were four storm-related deaths in Cuba, while about 750 homes, 7,900 acres (3,200 ha) of crops, and numerous bridges suffered flood damage. According to AON, damages from flooding totaled at least US$25 million in Cuba. In Florida, several locations in the Upper Keys and the Miami metropolitan area observed between 10 and 15 in (250 and 380 mm) of rainfall, with a peak total of 15.28 in (388 mm) near Hollywood. Extensive street flooding occurred in the Miami area, but water entered only a few properties. Across Broward and Miami-Dade counties combined, there were about 3,500 power outages. Damage from the precursor to Alex in Florida totaled $104,000. However, it was later determined that flood damages in Florida were more than $350 million.

=== Tropical Storm Bonnie ===
- Tropical storm (SSHWS)
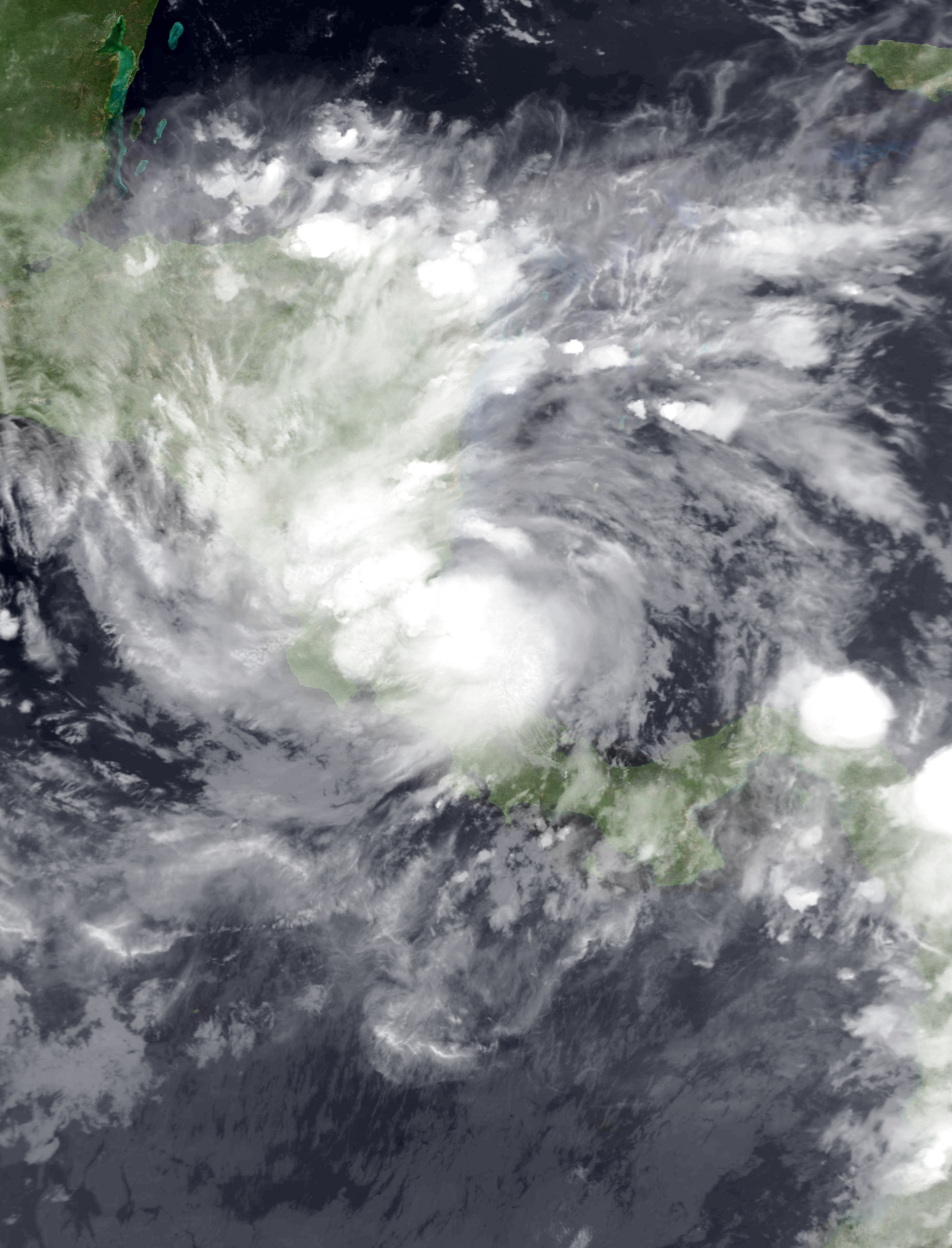
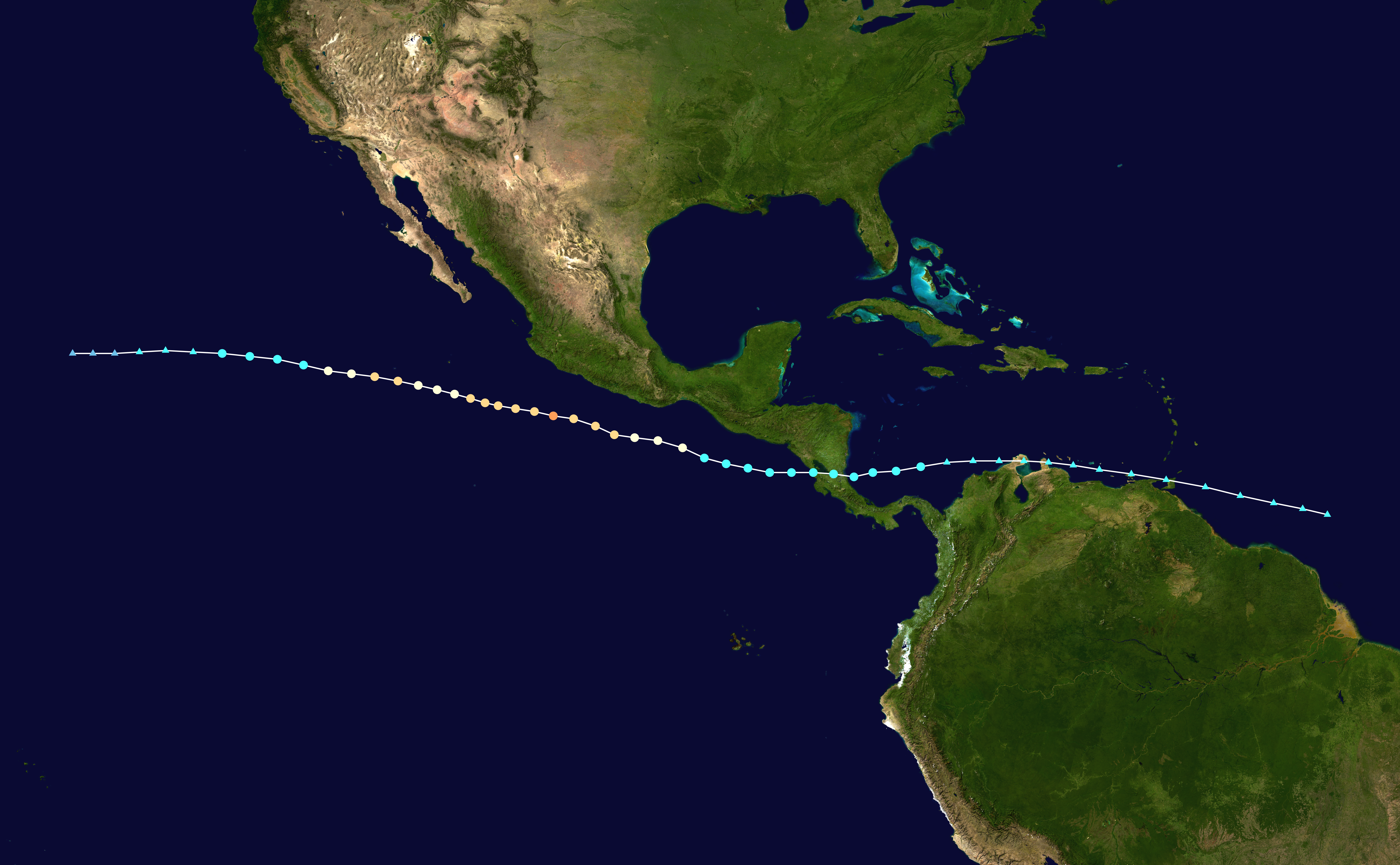
- Duration: July 1 – July 2 (Exited basin)
- Peak intensity: 60 mph (95 km/h) (1-min); 996 mbar (hPa)

A low-altitude tropical wave entered the Atlantic from the west coast of Africa on June 22, producing a large but disorganized area of showers and thunderstorms. Thunderstorm activity increased by June 27, while a NOAA Hurricane Hunters mission reported tropical-storm-force winds but no well-defined closed circulation. However, due to the threat the system posed to the Lesser Antilles, the NHC initiated advisories on it as Potential Tropical Cyclone Two later that same day. Later, after crossing the southern Windward Islands on June 28 and passing near the coast of Venezuela on the following day, the disturbance encountered more favorable conditions but failed to develop a distinct low-level circulation due to its fast forward speed and interaction with land. As the disturbance moved toward Central America on the morning of July 1, it became sufficiently organized to be classified as Tropical Storm Bonnie. Embedded in an environment of low wind shear and warm seas, Bonnie started to steadily intensify. At 03:00 UTC on July 2, Bonnie made landfall near the Costa Rica–Nicaragua border at its peak intensity within the Atlantic with sustained winds of 60 mph (95 km/h). Bonnie then crossed Central America and exited into the Eastern Pacific basin around 12:00 UTC on July 2.

Bonnie and its precursor disturbance produced gusty winds and heavy rainfall as it tracked through the southern Caribbean. On Trinidad, floodwaters damaged at least 40 homes in one village and left approximately 200,000 people without potable water. Heavy rainfall and landslides in Panama led to the evacuation of several families in Chiriquí Province. In Costa Rica, over 3,000 people evacuated as a result of flooding and mudslides, while 8,593 households lost electricity. Over 10,000 people lost power during the storm in Nicaragua. Four deaths occurred in the country, three after being swept away in rising rivers and one while attempting to rescue other people from a bus being carried away. Overall, Bonnie caused about $25 million in damage throughout the impacted regions.

=== Tropical Storm Colin ===
- Tropical storm (SSHWS)
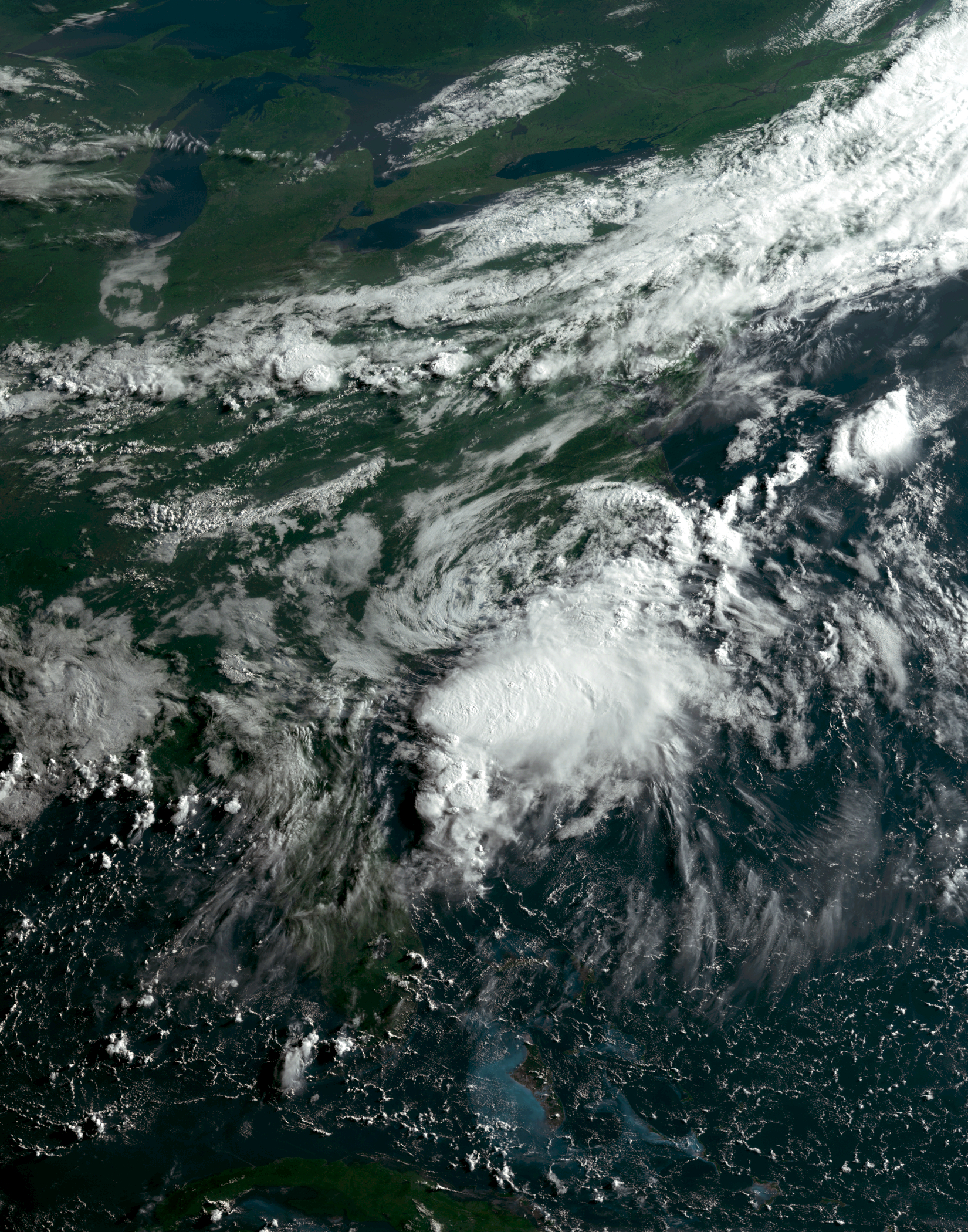
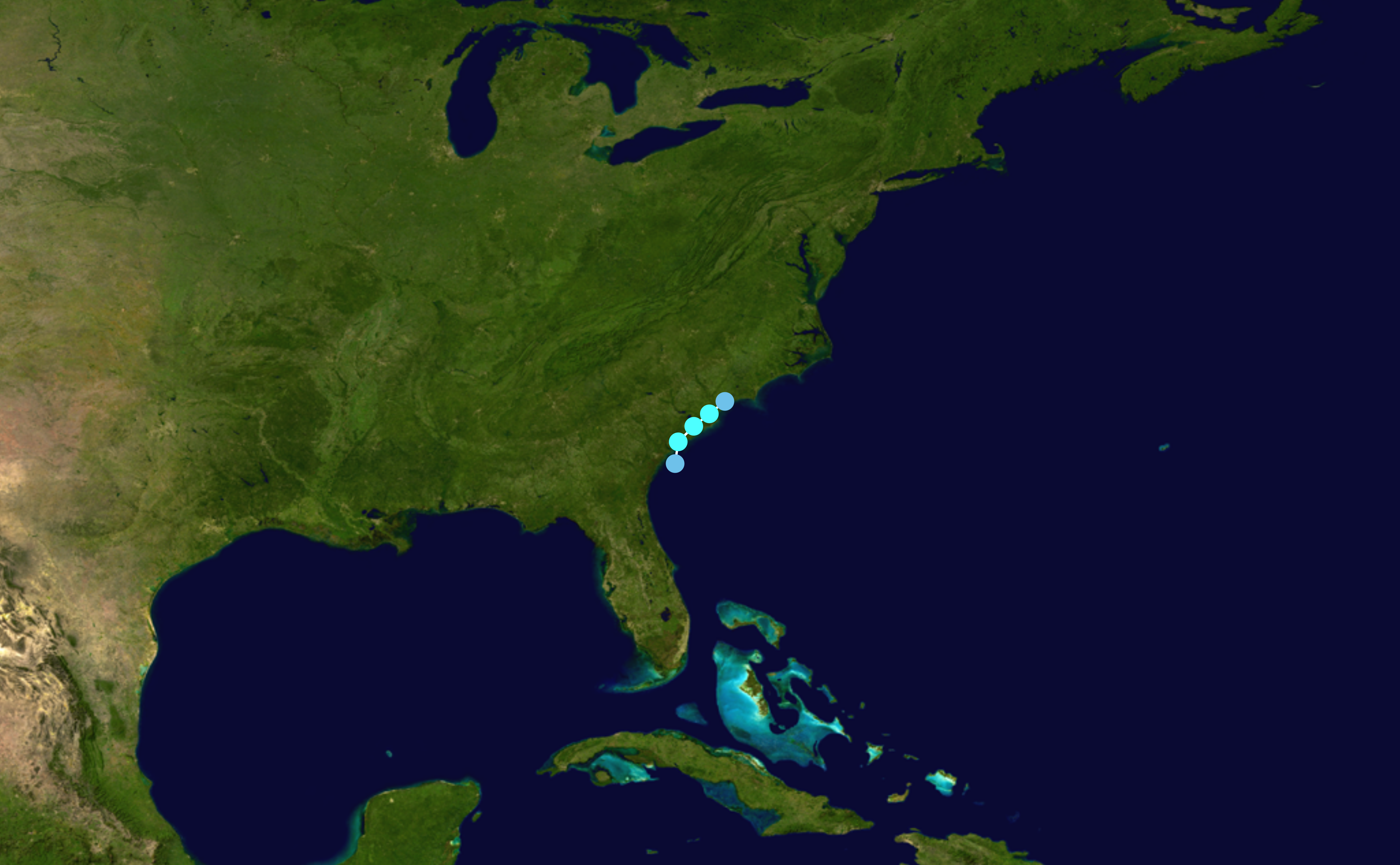
- Duration: July 1 – July 2
- Peak intensity: 40 mph (65 km/h) (1-min); 1011 mbar (hPa)

A low-pressure area formed along a surface trough offshore Savannah, Georgia, on July 1. The system then unexpectedly organized into a tropical depression around 18:00 UTC that day, and strengthened into Tropical Storm Colin at 23:30 UTC as it made landfall near Hunting Island, South Carolina. Simultaneously, Colin peaked with maximum sustained winds of 40 mph (65 km/h). The center of the storm remained just inland over coastal South Carolina on July 2, though most of its heavy rains and strong winds remained out over the Atlantic due to its proximity to the coast and wind shear. Colin became increasingly disorganized later that day, with its circulation becoming elongated due to the wind shear and continued land interaction. By 18:00 UTC on July 2, Colin had fallen to tropical depression intensity. The storm continued to weaken rapidly, and its low-level circulation dissipated over northeastern South Carolina by the end of that day.

A few locations from Northeast Florida to Southeastern North Carolina observed 3 to 4 in (76 to 102 mm) of precipitation. In South Carolina, rainfall amounts ranged from 1–3 in (25–76 mm) in parts of the Midlands region to a peak total of 7.59 in (193 mm) near Wadmalaw Island. A Fourth of July weekend event in Charleston was cancelled because of flooding at the event site, as was a festival in Southport, North Carolina. However, only minor damage occurred overall. One person drowned at Oak Island, North Carolina, due to rip currents generated by Colin.

=== Hurricane Danielle ===
- Category 1 hurricane (SSHWS)
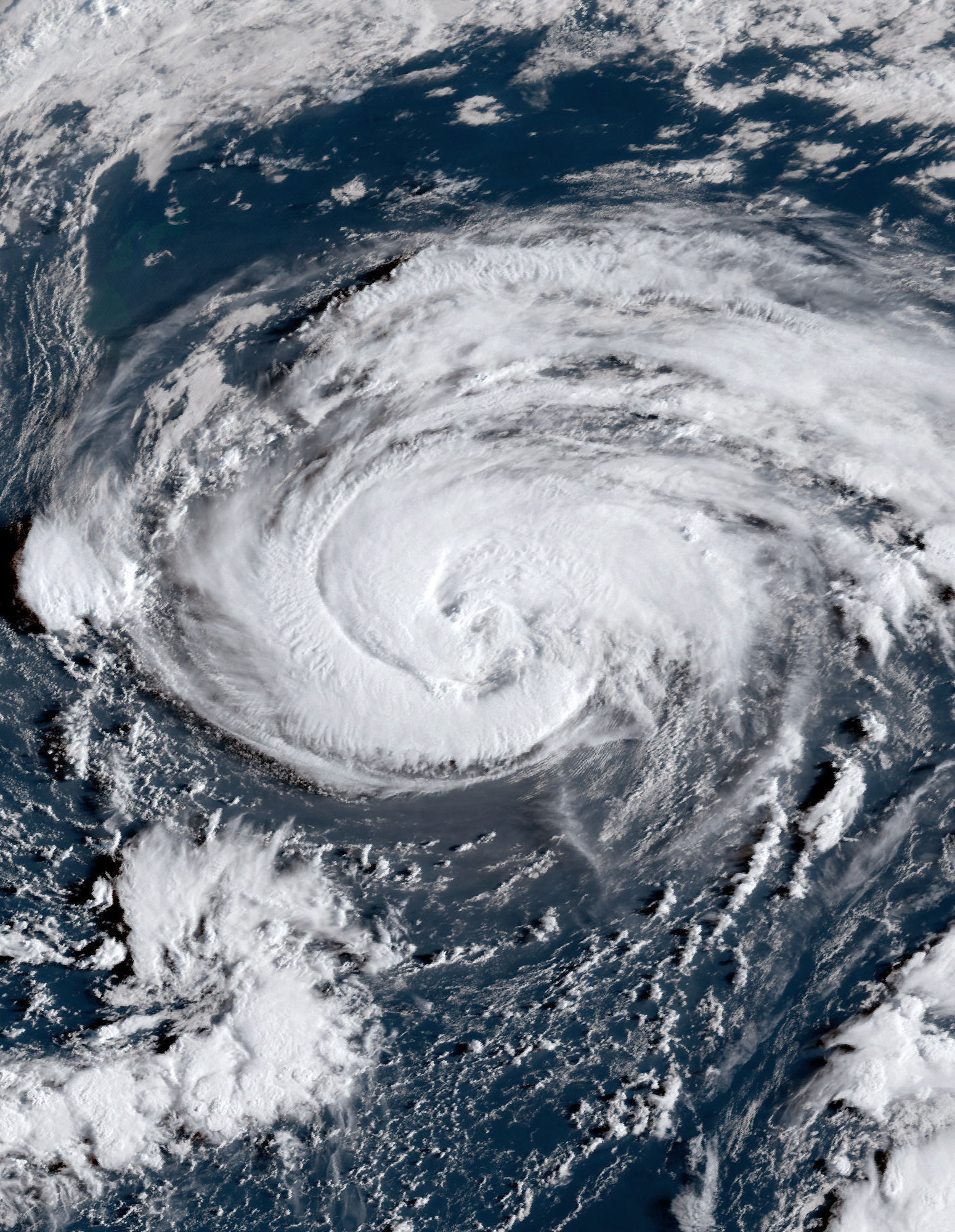
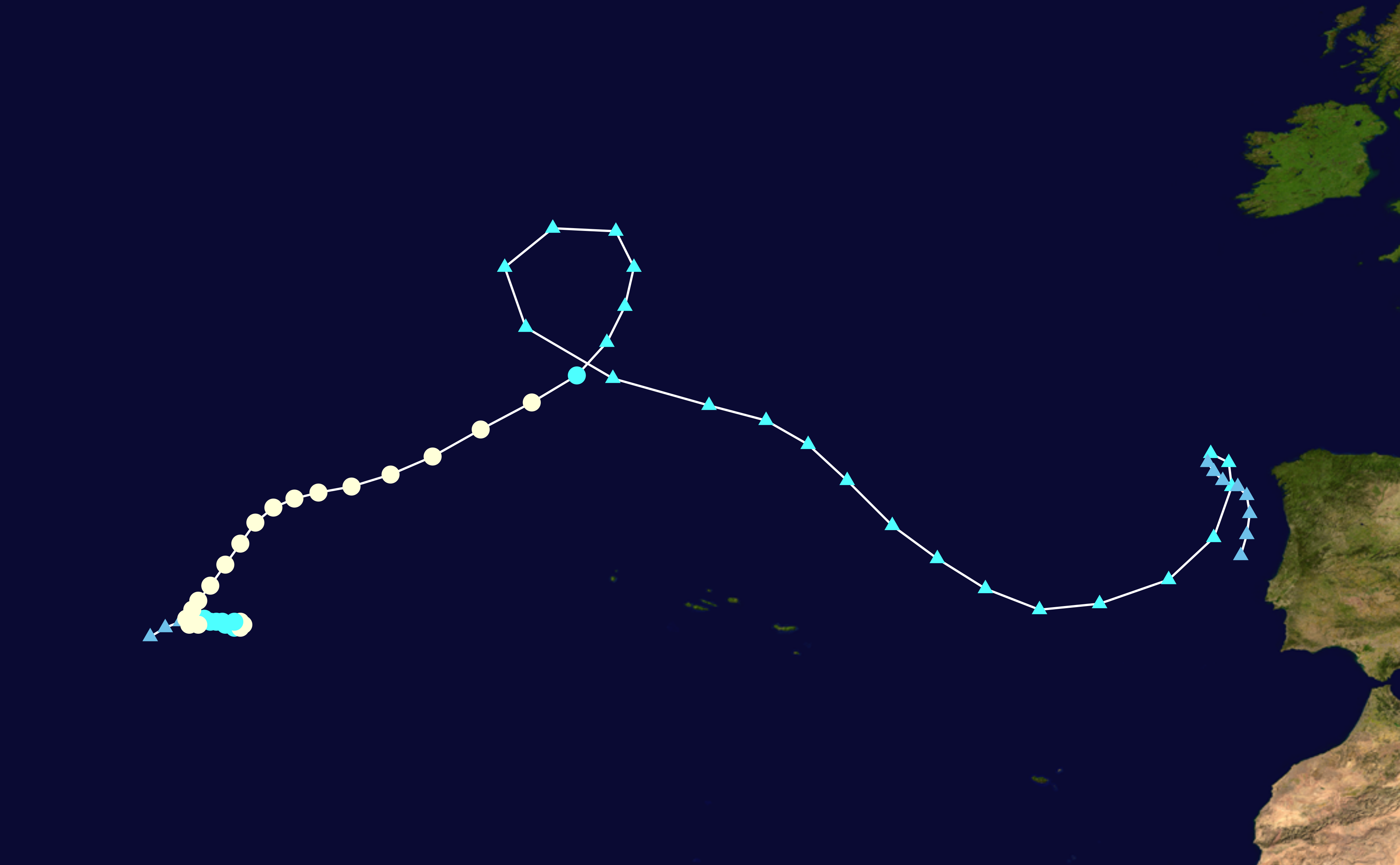
- Duration: September 1 – September 8
- Peak intensity: 85 mph (140 km/h) (1-min); 972 mbar (hPa)

On August 31, an area of low pressure formed along a decaying frontal zone over the central subtropical Atlantic. The disturbance quickly developed into Tropical Depression Five early on September 1 roughly 715 mi (1,150 km) southeast of Cape Race, Newfoundland, before strengthening into Tropical Storm Danielle by 12:00 UTC. Favorable conditions such as abnormally warm seas and light wind shear allowed Danielle to become a hurricane around 24 hours later. The hurricane stalled on September 2, caught south of a blocking high, and weakened back to a tropical storm the next day due to upwelling of cooler waters. Later, the storm drifted westward, where it again strengthened into a hurricane early on September 4. After turning northwestward, Danielle reached its peak intensity with sustained winds of 85 mph (140 km/h) late the following day. It then moved over a relatively cool part of the Gulf Stream and weakened to a low-end Category 1 hurricane. The hurricane briefly re-intensified when it moved over marginally warm waters on September 7, but resumed a weakening trend shortly thereafter. Danielle weakened to a tropical storm early on September 8, before transitioning into an extratropical cyclone later that day. The remnant extratropical system meandered over the northeastern Atlantic before dissipating offshore Portugal on September 15.

The remnants of Danielle dissipated offshore Portugal as an extratropical cyclone, bringing heavy rain to the country, including 3.3 in (84 mm) of precipitation in Guarda in 24 hours. Between September 12–13, 644 accidents were reported throughout the country, along with many instances of downed trees and flash floods. One man was hospitalized after he was swept away by floodwaters. In Manteigas, which had been ravaged by intense summer forest fires in nearby areas of the Serra da Estrela mountain range, floods and landslides caused major damage and at least four vehicles were dragged into the Zêzere River. Portuguese authorities also reported minor wind and flood damage in Lisbon and Setúbal. Much of Spain was put on yellow alert as wind, rain and thunderstorms triggered by the cyclone moved inland.

=== Hurricane Earl ===
- Category 2 hurricane (SSHWS)
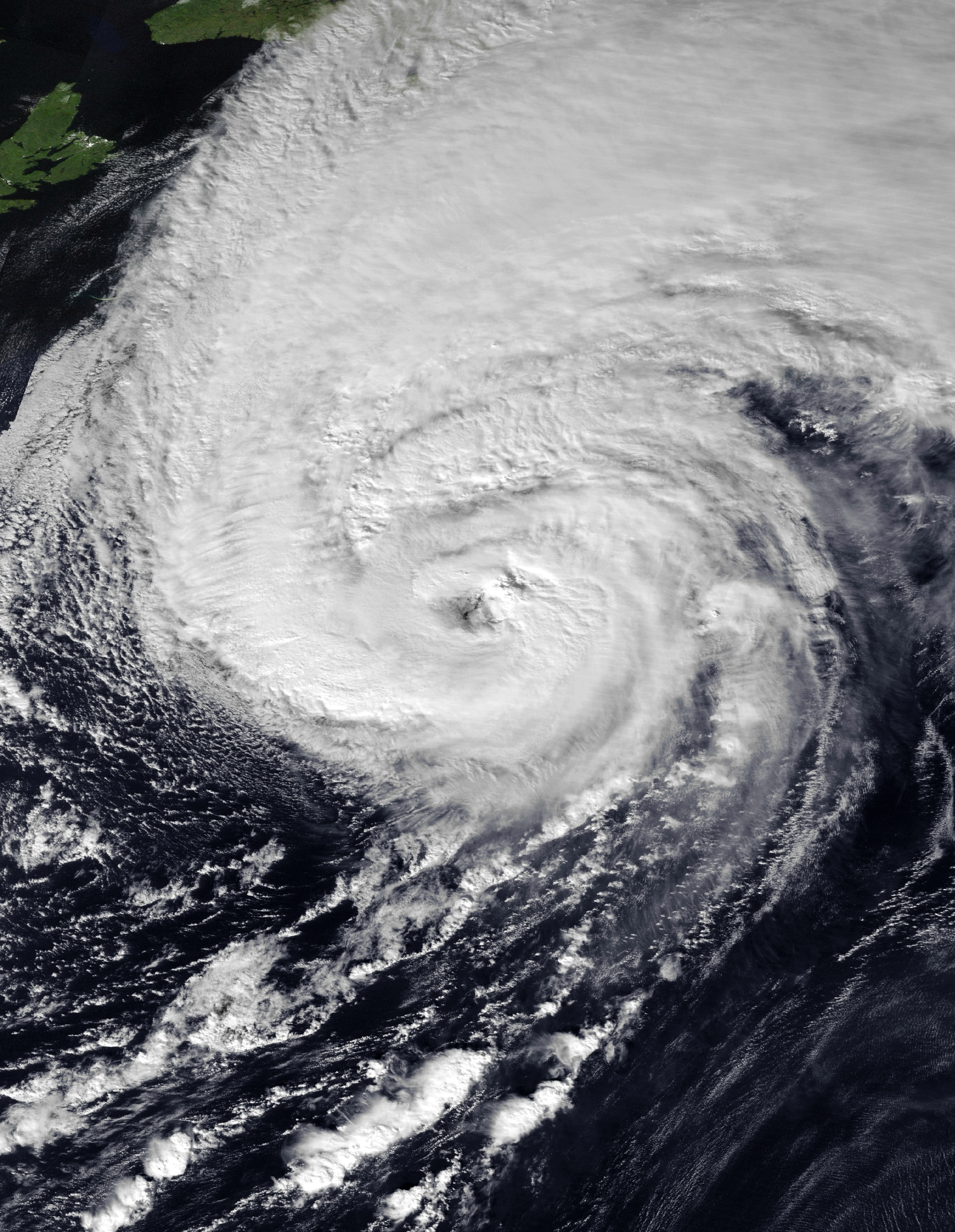
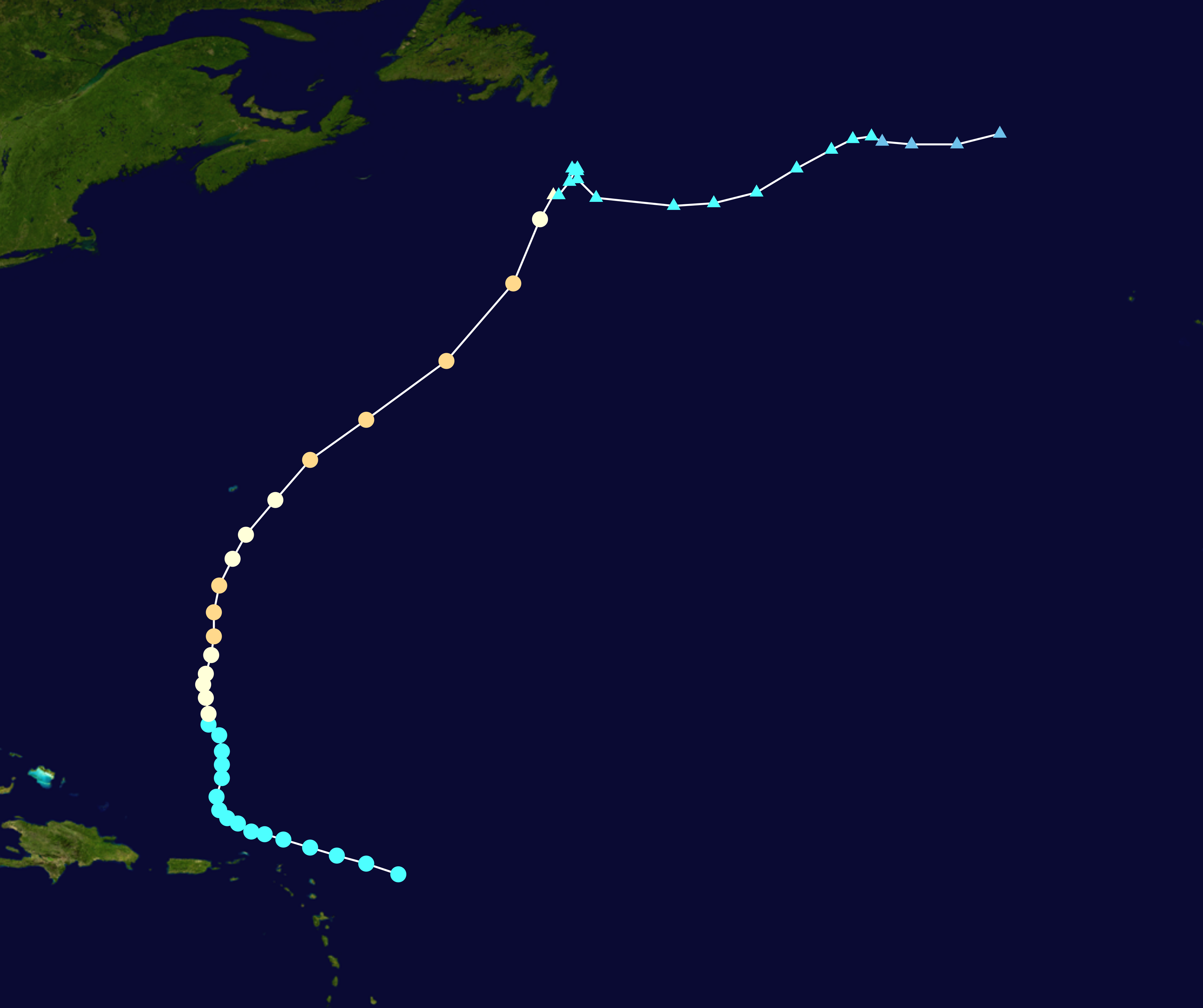
- Duration: September 2 – September 10
- Peak intensity: 110 mph (175 km/h) (1-min); 948 mbar (hPa)

On August 25, a tropical wave emerged into the Atlantic from the west coast of Africa. Convective activity remained sporadic and disorganized for several days as the wave moved generally west-northwestward through an environment of dry air and unfavorable wind shear. However, convection markedly increased on September 1 as the system approached warm waters near the Lesser Antilles. Late on the following day, the system organized into Tropical Storm Earl approximately 205 mi (330 km) east of Barbuda. Continuously unconducive wind shear prevented significant intensification before Earl turned northward on September 5 through a break in a subtropical ridge over the central Atlantic. Possibly due to a diffluent environment and favorable thermodynamic conditions, Earl intensified into a hurricane late on September 6. The storm briefly strengthened into a Category 2 hurricane early on September 8 but then weakened later that day, likely due to dry air.

Around 12:00 UTC on September 9, Earl re-strengthened into a Category 2 hurricane. About 12 hours later, the hurricane peaked with sustained winds of 110 mph (175 km/h) and a minimum barometric pressure of 948 mbar (28.0 inHg) as it accelerated northeastward in advance of a mid-latitude trough. However, Earl soon began losing tropical characteristics and transitioned into an extratropical cyclone around 18:00 UTC on September 10, about 230 mi (370 km) south of Cape Race, Newfoundland. The extratropical remnants executed a cyclonic loop south of Newfoundland before moving generally eastward across the Atlantic before dissipating late on September 15.

The outerbands of Earl produced rainfall amounts generally ranging from 3 to 5 in (76 to 127 mm) in eastern Puerto Rico, while a weather station near Finca La Loma recorded a peak total of 7.7 in (200 mm) of precipitation. Two people died near Salinas after being struck by lightning while riding a jet ski. Bermuda was buffeted with sustained winds of 35 mph (60 km/h) as Hurricane Earl passed within about 90 mi (145 km) of the island's eastern coast; higher gusts were reported, including one of 67 mph (108 km/h) at the National Museum of Bermuda. There were localized power outages across the archipelago but no large-scale damage was observed. During a 36-hour period September 10–12, 7–8 in (175–200 mm) of rain fell in the St. Johns area of Newfoundland and Labrador, causing the Waterford River to overflow, which led to urban flooding. Similar rainfall amounts were also reported in communities throughout the Avalon Peninsula. Additionally, the cyclone generated rough surf which damaged the breakwater on the coast in the area of Trepassey, causing localized flooding.

=== Hurricane Fiona ===
- Category 4 hurricane (SSHWS)
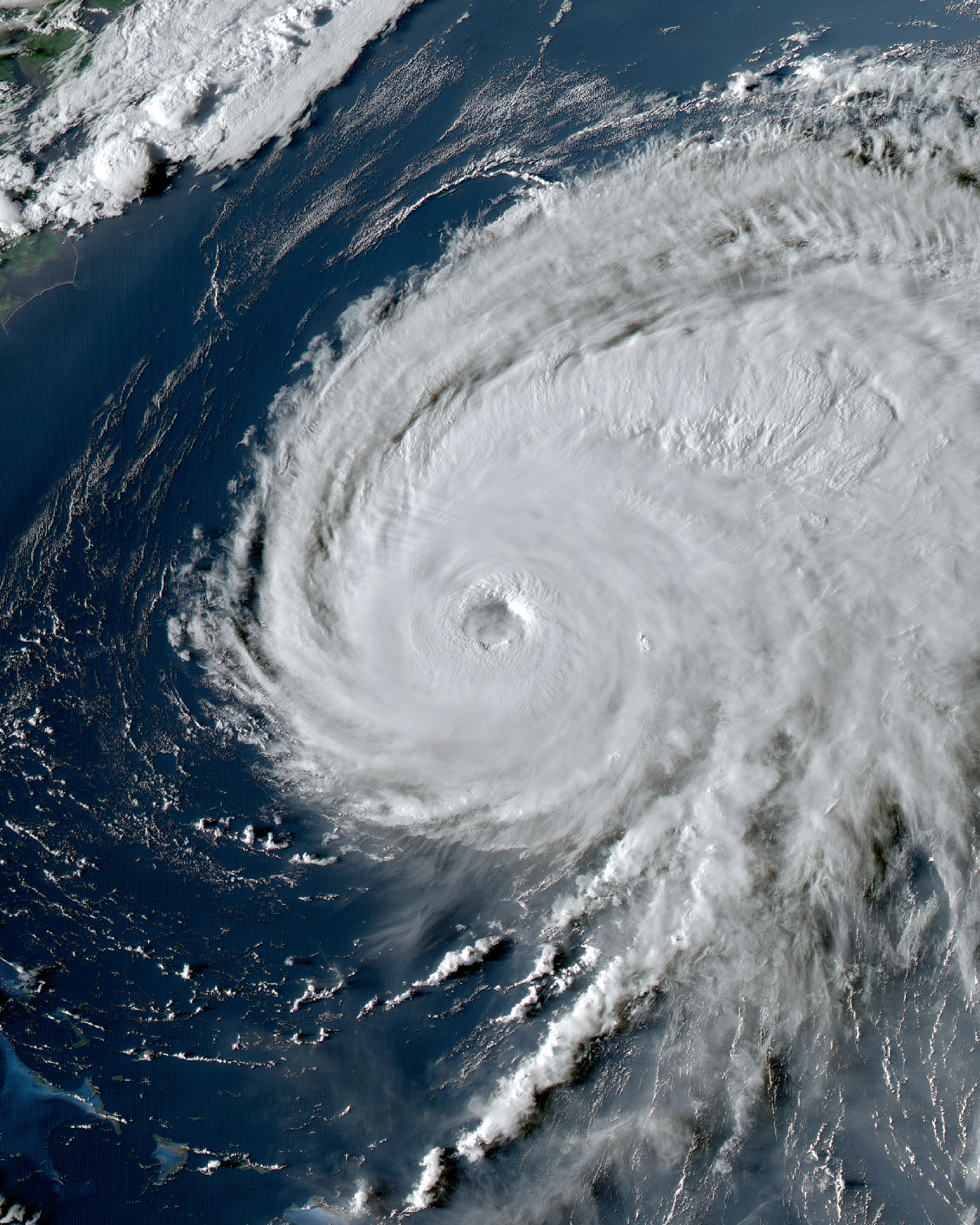
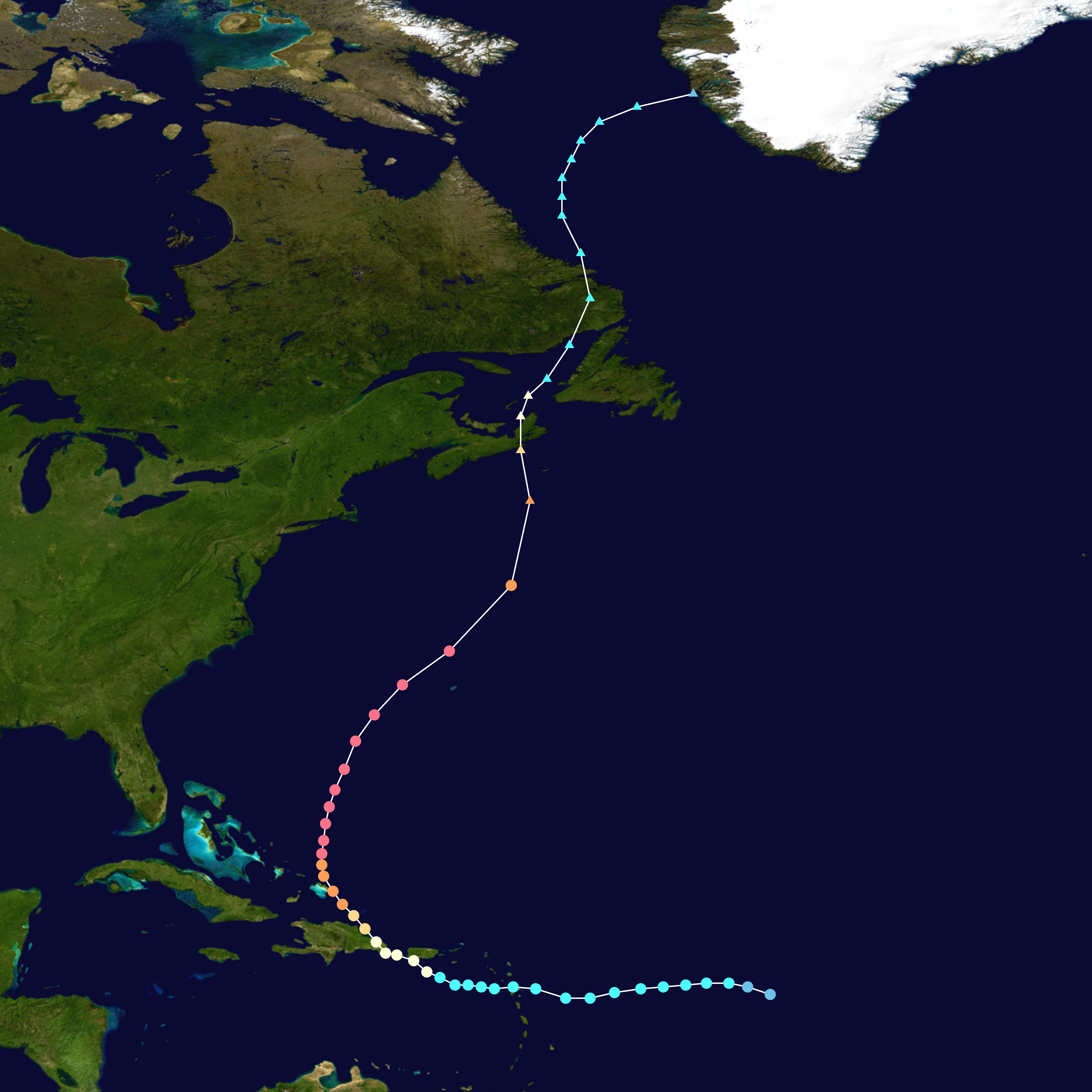
- Duration: September 14 – September 23
- Peak intensity: 140 mph (220 km/h) (1-min); 931 mbar (hPa)

A tropical wave exited the west coast of Africa and entered the Atlantic on September 7. Although shower and thunderstorm activity was initially organized, dry air significantly limited convection as the wave trekked westward for several days. However, convection began increasing on September 12 and consolidating late on September 13. A well-defined circulation formed early the following day, leading to the development of a tropical depression approximately 1,035 mi (1,665 km) east of the Lesser Antilles. Although the depression strengthened into Tropical Storm Fiona later on September 14, wind shear prevented further significant intensification for a few days as the storm continued to move generally westward. Late on September 16, Fiona struck Guadeloupe with winds of 60 mph (95 km/h). After entering the Caribbean, the cyclone encountered decreasing wind shear, allowing it to intensify into a hurricane on September 18. At 19:20 UTC, Fiona made landfall in the Lajas municipality of Puerto Rico near Punta Tocon with winds of 85 mph (140 km/h). The storm quickly emerged into the Mona Passage and moved west-northwestward until striking the Dominican Republic near Boca de Yuma with winds of 90 mph (150 km/h) around 07:30 UTC on September 19.

Fiona emerged into the Atlantic from the north coast of the Dominican Republic later on September 19 and soon intensified into a Category 2 hurricane. The storm then reached Category 3 intensity early on the following day, prior to striking Grand Turk Island around 11:00 UTC. Thereafter, Fiona moved north-northeastward due to a weakness in the subtropical ridge and strengthened into a Category 4 hurricane early on September 21. At that time, the cyclone peaked with sustained winds of 140 mph (220 km/h). Although sustained winds then decreased slightly, the storm's minimum pressure fell to 931 mbar (27.5 inHg) early on September 23. Fiona also expanded significantly that day while passing about 115 mi (185 km) northwest of Bermuda around 10:00 UTC. The storm accelerated northeastward and then north-northeastward while merging with a cold front several hours later, with Fiona becoming extratropical by 00:00 UTC on September 24 approximately 220 mi (355 km) southeast of Halifax, Nova Scotia. The remnants of Fiona remained intense and struck Nova Scotia around 07:00 UTC that day and then extreme eastern Quebec on September 25, several hours before reaching the Labrador Sea. The extratropical cyclone dissipated just offshore Nuuk, Greenland, late on September 27.

Several of the Leeward Islands recorded tropical storm-force winds and heavy rainfall, with up to 22.22 in (564 mm) of precipitation on Guadeloupe, leading to one death after the overflowing Rivière des Pères swept away a house. Still recovering from the effects of Hurricane Maria in 2017 and saturated from precipitation produced by Earl, torrential rains fell island-wide on Puerto Rico on September 18–19, exceeding 30 in (760 mm) in some regions, causing destructive flash flooding, landslides, and rockfalls that washed out or blocked numerous roads and bridges. In addition, the effects of the storm resulted in an island-wide power grid failure. A loss of approximately 90% of commercial crops also occurred. Overall, Fiona caused 23 deaths and about $2.5 billion in damage in Puerto Rico, making Fiona the island's third costliest tropical cyclone on record. In the Dominican Republic, heavy rainfall and hurricane-force winds destroyed more than 2,000 homes and damaged about 8,500 others, displacing over 43,000 people. More than 400,000 people lost electricity and 1.2 million people experienced a disruption of water services. Two deaths occurred in the country, while damage totaled approximately $375 million. In the Turks and Caicos Islands, strong winds downed many trees and power poles and damaged some homes. Similar impacts were reported in Bermuda, along with approximately 29,000 customers losing electricity. In Atlantic Canada, strong winds felled thousands of power lines and trees across the region, leaving over 500,000 customers without electricity and causing significant damage to roofs and windows in Nova Scotia. Large waves and storm surge demolished more than 100 homes in southwestern Newfoundland and flooded many dwellings and businesses on the Magdalen Islands. Eight deaths were reported in Atlantic Canada, while insured losses alone reached $800 million, making the remnants of Fiona the costliest weather disaster in the region's history.

=== Tropical Storm Gaston ===
- Tropical storm (SSHWS)
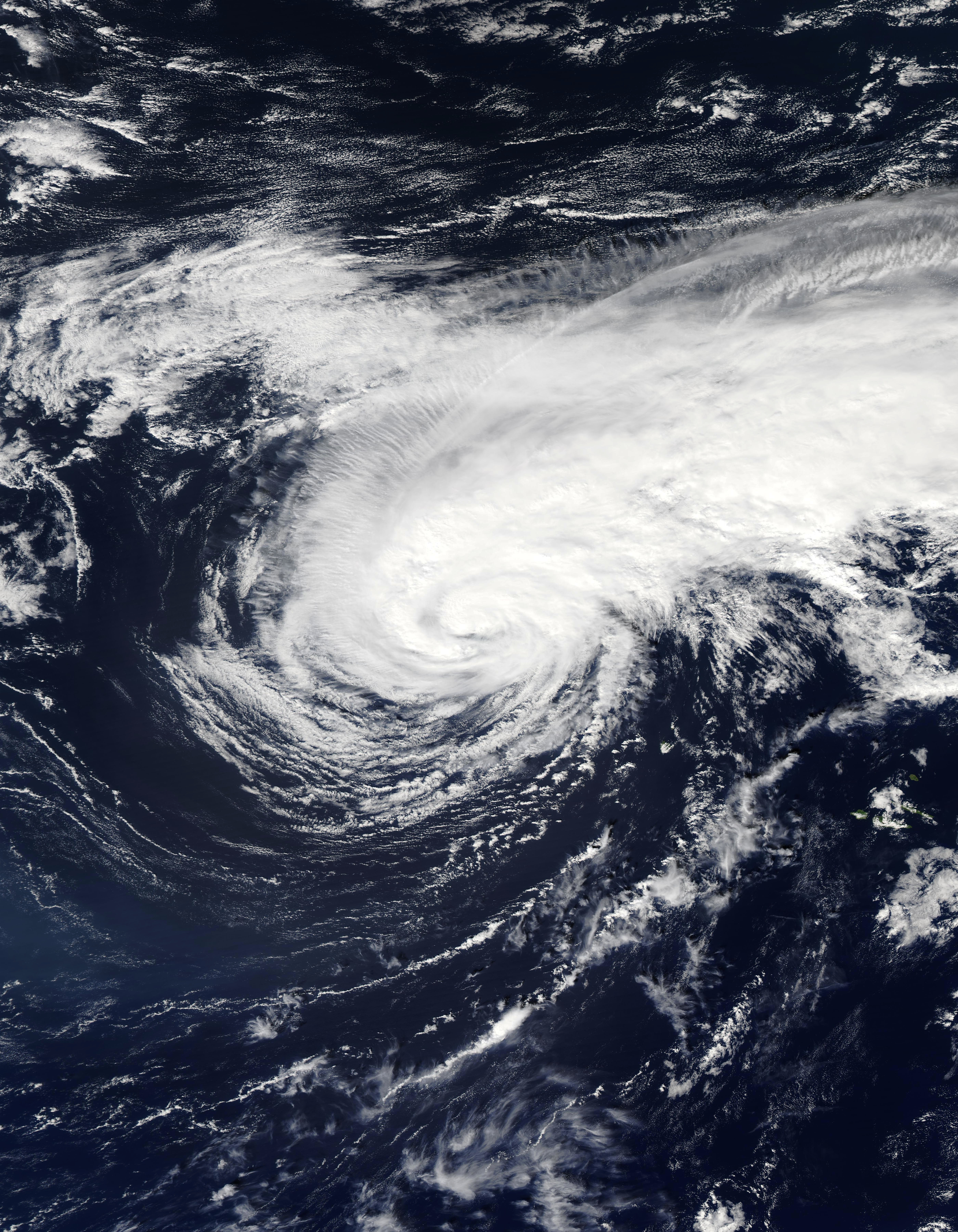
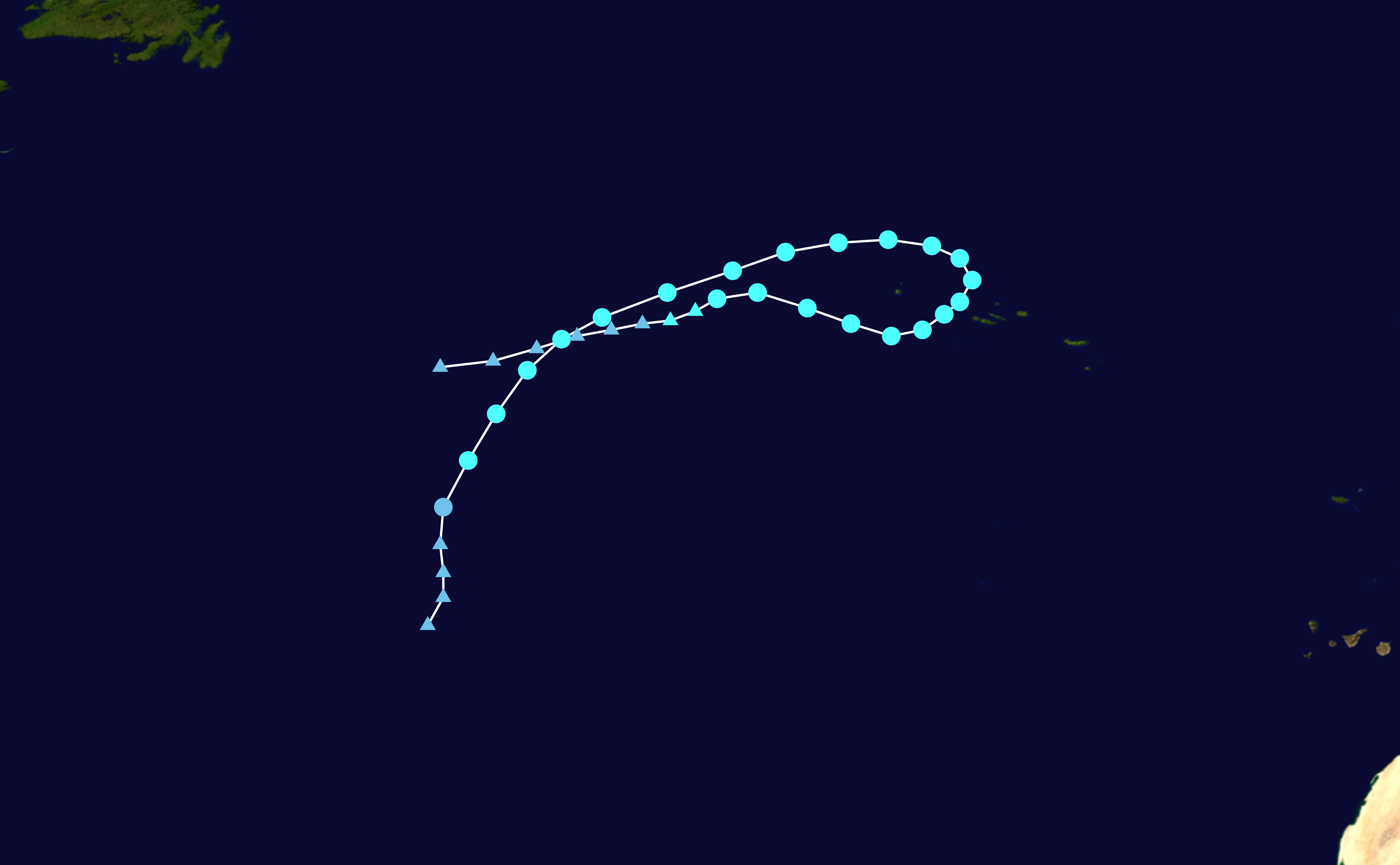
- Duration: September 20 – September 25
- Peak intensity: 65 mph (100 km/h) (1-min); 994 mbar (hPa)

A tropical wave moved off the west coast of Africa and entered the Atlantic on September 12, initially producing disorganized showers and thunderstorms. After the wave moved generally westward to about midway between Africa and the Lesser Antilles, deep convection began consolidating along its northern side between September 16 and September 17. Although a surface low developed on September 19, convection remained disorganized. However, upon acquiring a well-defined center and persistent deep convection on September 20, the system became Tropical Depression Eight about 1,100 mi (1,770 km) east of Bermuda. The depression strengthened into Tropical Storm Gaston six hours later while moving north-northeastward along the western edge of a high-pressure area. Despite only marginally warm water temperatures and moderate to strong wind shear, Gaston strengthened to peak with sustained winds of 65 mph (100 km/h) early on September 21.

However, additional strengthening was prevented as dry air intruded into Gaston. A blocking mid-level high pressure caused the storm to turn southeastward and then southwestward on September 23 and later to the west on the following day. Passing between the Azores late on September 23 and early on September 24, Gaston generated heavy rainfall across the archipelago, especially in the western and central islands. A weather station at Horta on Faial Island measured a wind gust of 41 mph (66 km/h) as Gaston passed through. Convection diminished significantly as the storm continued westward and by 00:00 UTC on September 26, Gaston became extratropical about 345 mi (555 km) west-southwest of Flores Island. The remnant low moved west-southwestward until dissipating about 48 hours later.

=== Hurricane Ian ===
- Category 5 hurricane (SSHWS)
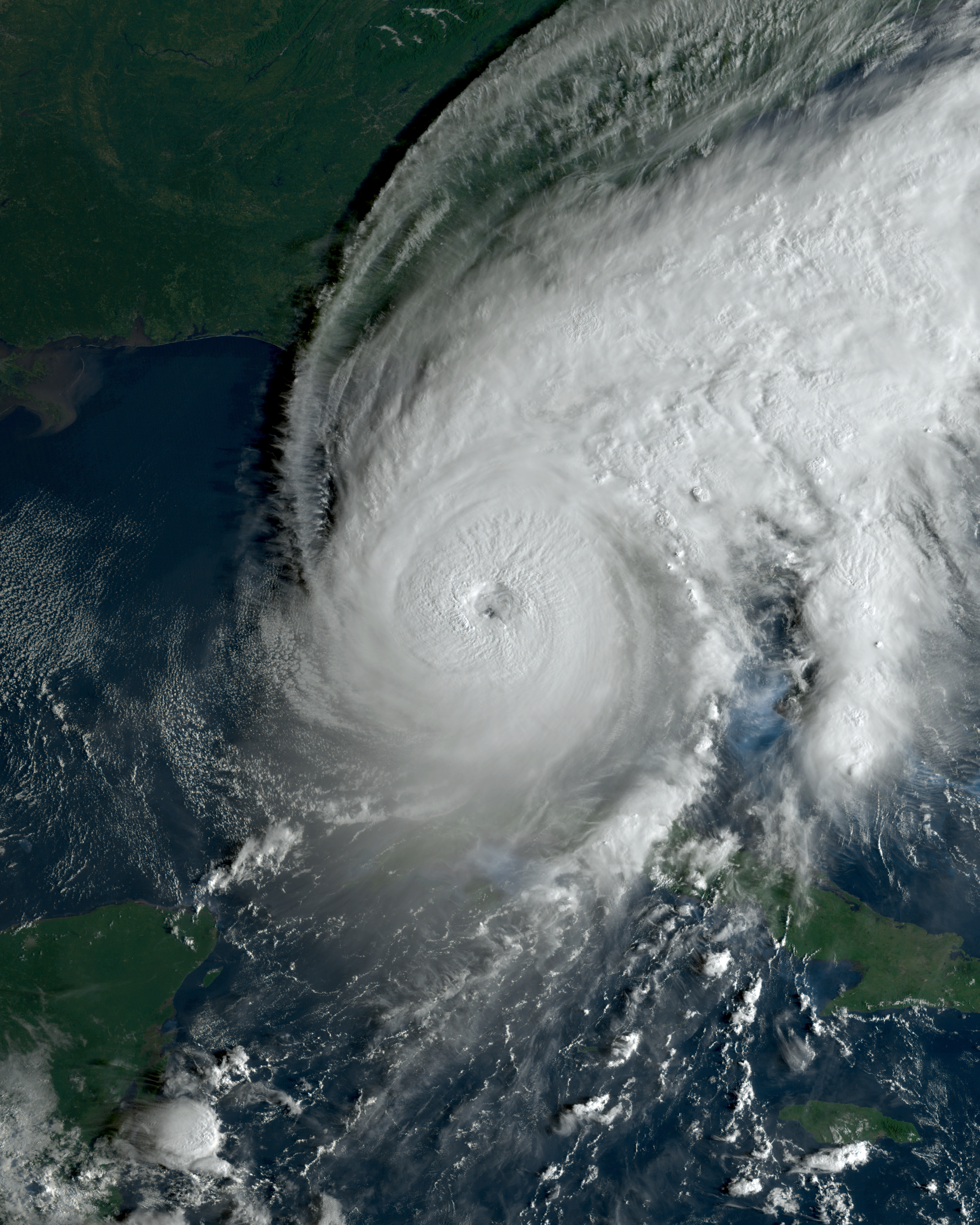
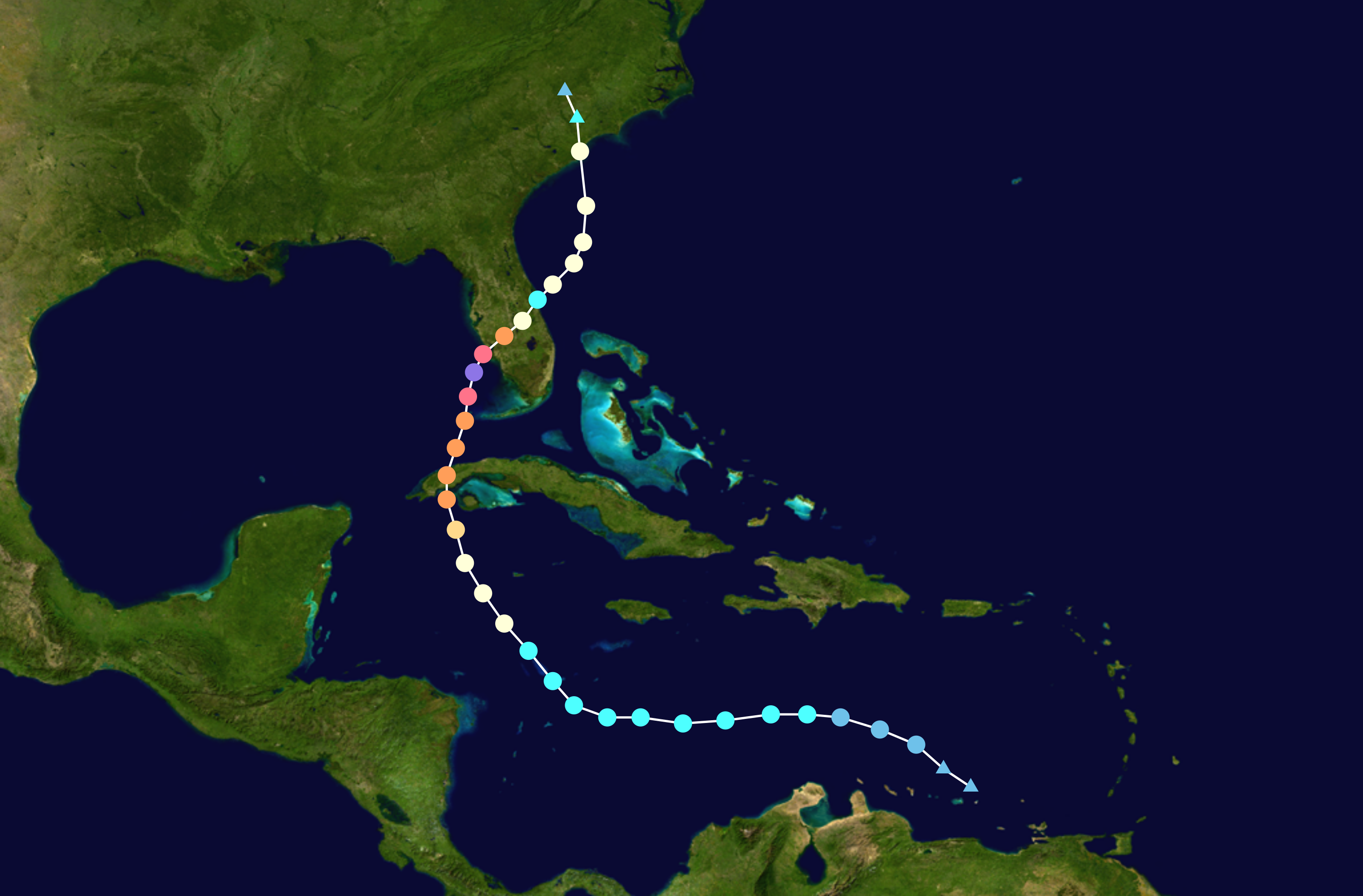
- Duration: September 23 – September 30
- Peak intensity: 160 mph (260 km/h) (1-min); 937 mbar (hPa)

Between September 14 and September 15, a tropical wave emerged into the Atlantic from the west coast of Africa and moved westward for several days with disorganized showers and thunderstorms. Although the system gained additional convection upon reaching the southeastern Caribbean on September 21, wind shear prevented further development. By 06:00 UTC on September 23, however, Tropical Depression Nine formed around 150 mi (240 km) east-northeast of Aruba. The depression moved west-northwestward due to a building mid-level ridge and strengthened into Tropical Storm Ian early the next day. Ian then turned westward and initially failed to intensify further in an environment with moderate to strong wind shear. After curving to the northwest, the storm strengthened into a hurricane early on September 26. Thereafter, Ian rapidly intensified, becoming a major hurricane about 24 hours later. Around 08:30 UTC on September 27, the hurricane made landfall in Cuba near La Coloma, Pinar del Río Province, with winds of 125 mph (205 km/h). The cyclone hardly weakened while crossing Cuba and emerged into the Gulf of Mexico around 14:00 UTC.

Early on September 28, Ian struck Dry Tortugas, Florida, with winds of 125 mph (205 km/h) as the storm headed north-northeastward along a broad trough and the western periphery of a subtropical ridge. Favorable conditions in the Gulf of Mexico then allowed another period of rapid deepening to commence. At 12:00 UTC on September 28, Ian briefly attained Category 5 status and peaked with maximum sustained winds of 160 mph (260 km/h) and a minimum barometric pressure of 937 mbar (27.7 inHg). Less favorable conditions caused Ian to weaken to a Category 4 hurricane prior to its landfall on Cayo Costa Island, Florida, with winds of 150 mph (240 km/h), at 19:05 UTC. About an hour and a half later, the storm struck near Punta Gorda with winds of 145 mph (230 km/h). The hurricane weakened while slowly traversing the Florida peninsula, falling to tropical storm status while emerging into the Atlantic near Cape Canaveral at 12:00 UTC on September 29. Although most of its convection was displaced north of the center, Ian quickly re-intensified into a hurricane six hours later. Early on September 30, the storm accelerated after turning northward. Ian made its final landfall at 18:05 UTC near Georgetown, South Carolina, with winds of 80 mph (130 km/h). The storm soon merged with a cold front and transitioned into an extratropical cyclone by 00:00 UTC on October 1. Several hours later, the remnants of Ian dissipated over North Carolina.

While in the early stages of developing, the system brought gusty winds and heavy rain to Trinidad and Tobago, the ABC islands, and the northern coast of South America on September 21–22. Ian also caused five deaths in Cuba. Much of western portions of the country experienced hurricane-force winds and heavy rainfall, which exceeded 20 in (510 mm) in some areas. Consequently, Ian left extensive impacts to factories, hospitals, roads, tobacco farms, and homes, with more than 100,000 dwellings damaged or destroyed in Pinar del Río Province alone. Three provinces initially lost power, but later the nation's entire electrical grid collapsed. Significant storm surge inundation occurred along the coasts of the Gulf of Guanahacabibes and Isla de la Juventud. Damage in Cuba totaled about $200 million. Storm surge and high winds led to extreme damage in Southwest Florida. Lee County, where Ian made its first landfall in Florida at Category 4 intensity and produced a storm surge which peaked at 7.25 ft (2.21 m) in Fort Myers, reported some degree of impact to 52,514 structures, with 5,369 of those demolished and 14,245 others extensively damaged. Bridges and roadways, especially along the coast or on the barrier islands, also suffered major impacts. In neighboring Collier County, strong winds and storm surge inflicted major damage to more than 3,500 buildings and destroyed 33 others. The outerbands of Ian spawned 14 tornadoes in Florida, including an EF-2 tornado that caused significant damage to some condominiums and injured two people in Kings Point. Ian also produced historic flooding across Central Florida due to a wide swath of rainfall totals generally ranging from 10–20 in (250–510 mm), with Osceola, Seminole, and Volusia counties reporting damage or destruction to thousands of buildings and homes. More than 3.28 million customers across the state lost electricity. An estimated 150 fatalities occurred in Florida, with 36 of the direct deaths reported in Lee County. Later, heavy rainfall and storm surge caused damage from the Carolinas to Maryland, but to a much lesser extent than in Florida. Ian also left five fatalities in North Carolina and one in Virginia, all due to indirect causes. Overall, Ian caused approximately $112.9 billion in damage in the United States, making it the nation's third costliest tropical cyclone.

=== Tropical Storm Hermine ===
- Tropical storm (SSHWS)
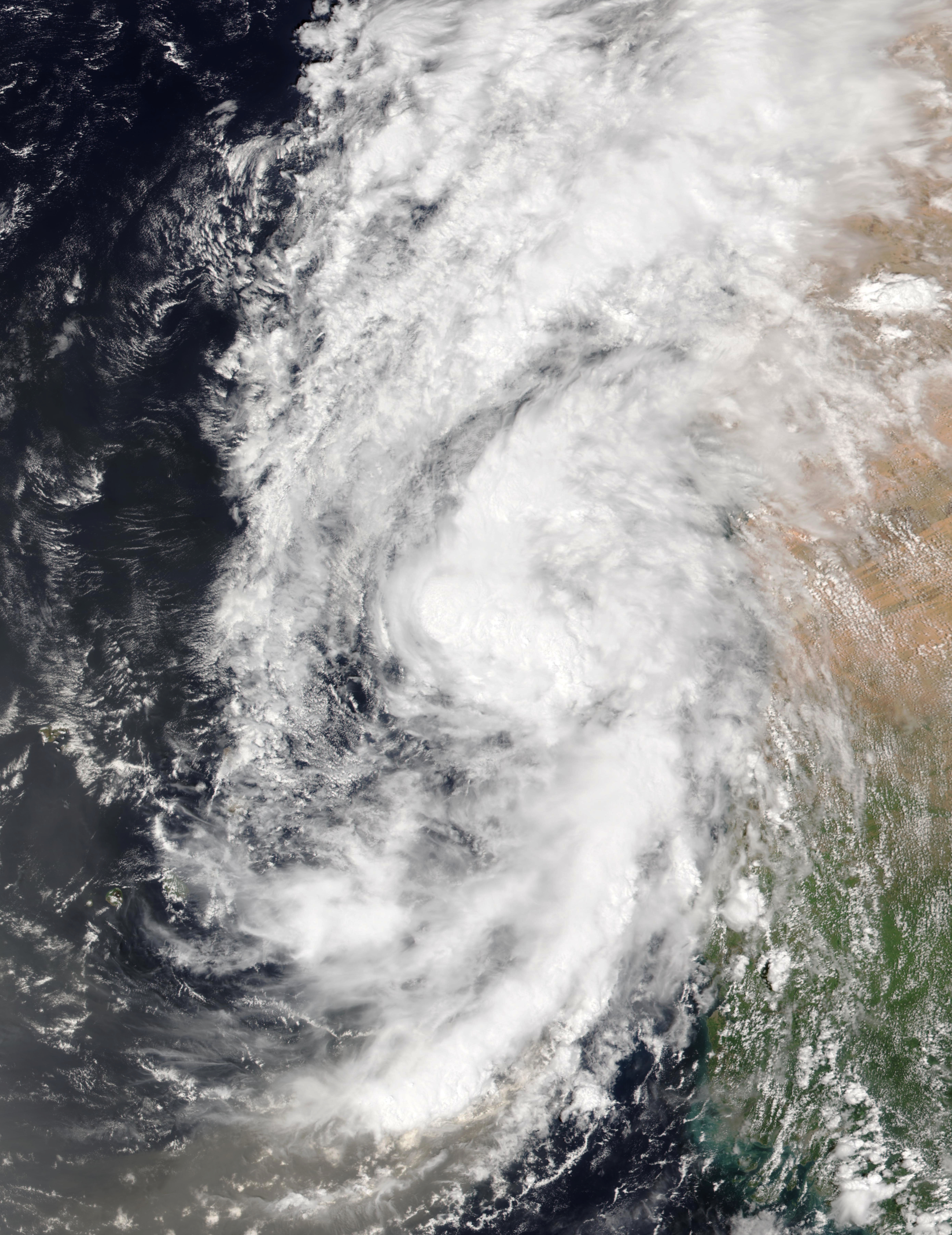
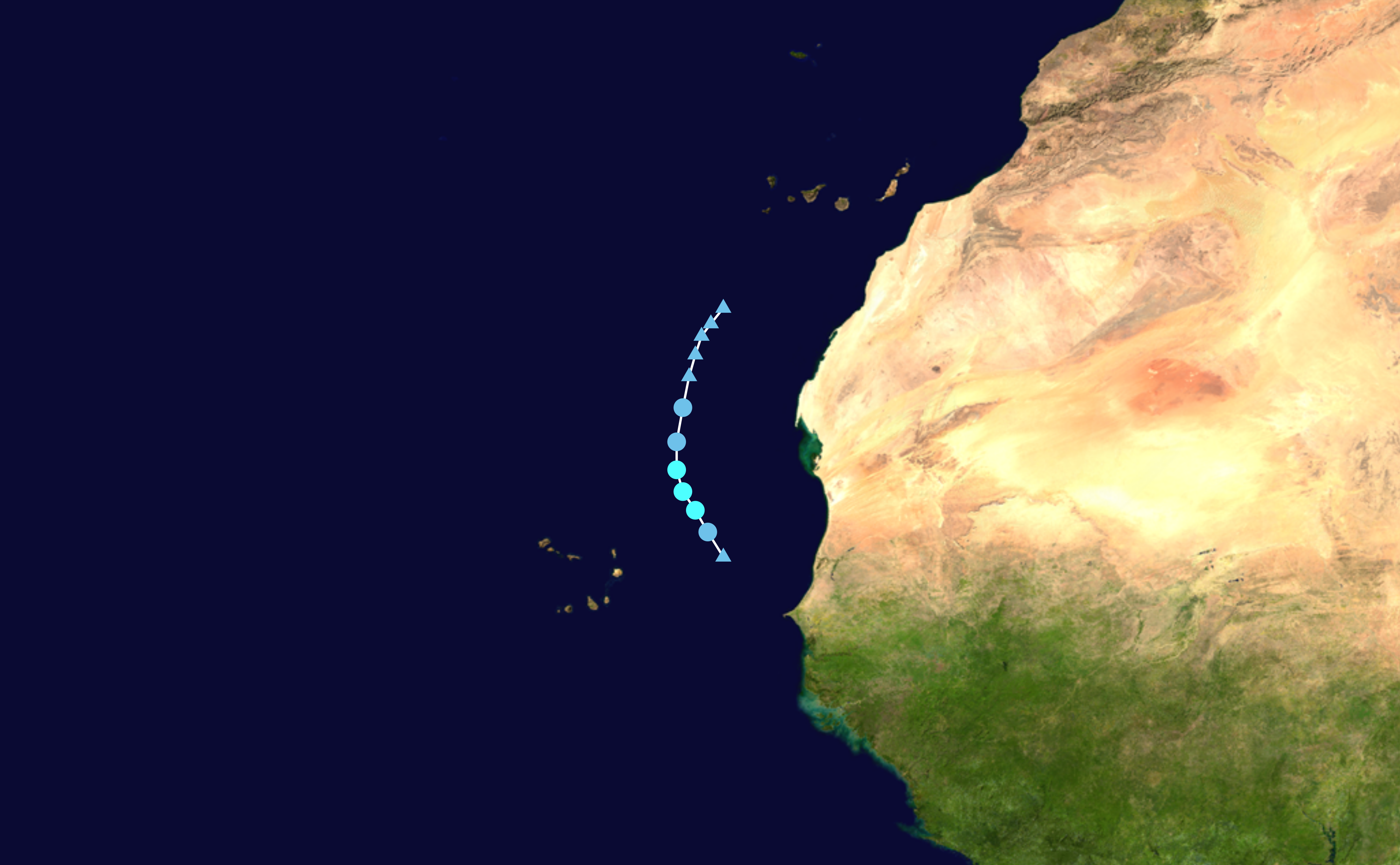
- Duration: September 23 – September 24
- Peak intensity: 40 mph (65 km/h) (1-min); 1003 mbar (hPa)

On September 22, a tropical wave being monitored by the NHC emerged off the coast of West Africa into the tropical Atlantic east of Cabo Verde. It quickly organized, becoming Tropical Depression Ten at 12:00 UTC on September 23, and then strengthened into Tropical Storm Hermine six hours later. It is one of few tropical cyclones on record to form and track between the Cabo Verde Islands and the coast of Africa. Development beyond a weak, 40 mph (65 km/h)-tropical storm was stymied by southwesterly shear into the next day as the system moved northward. On account of the shear, Hermine weakened into a tropical depression at 12:00 UTC on September 24, and degenerated into a post-tropical low within 12 hours, while situated about 240 mi (385 km) northwest of Nouadhibou, Mauritania. The remnant low moved northeastward until degenerating into a surface trough early on September 26 to the southwest of the Canary Islands.

Hermine brought heavy rainfall to the Canary Islands, peaking at 20.87 in (530 mm) on La Palma, while Gran Canaria Airport observed 4.96 in (126 mm), approximately 83% of its average annual precipitation total. The subsequent floods damaged many structures and some roadways, caused power outages impacting several thousands of people, and downed trees. A total of 216 schools experienced some degree of damage, with 24 suffering extensive damage. Landslides blocked roads in about 690 locations. Floodwaters entered four homes in the capital city of Santa Cruz de Tenerife. Additionally, more than 140 flights were cancelled across the archipelago. Damage in the Canary Islands exceeded 10 million euro (US$9.8 million).

=== Tropical Depression Eleven ===
- Tropical depression (SSHWS)
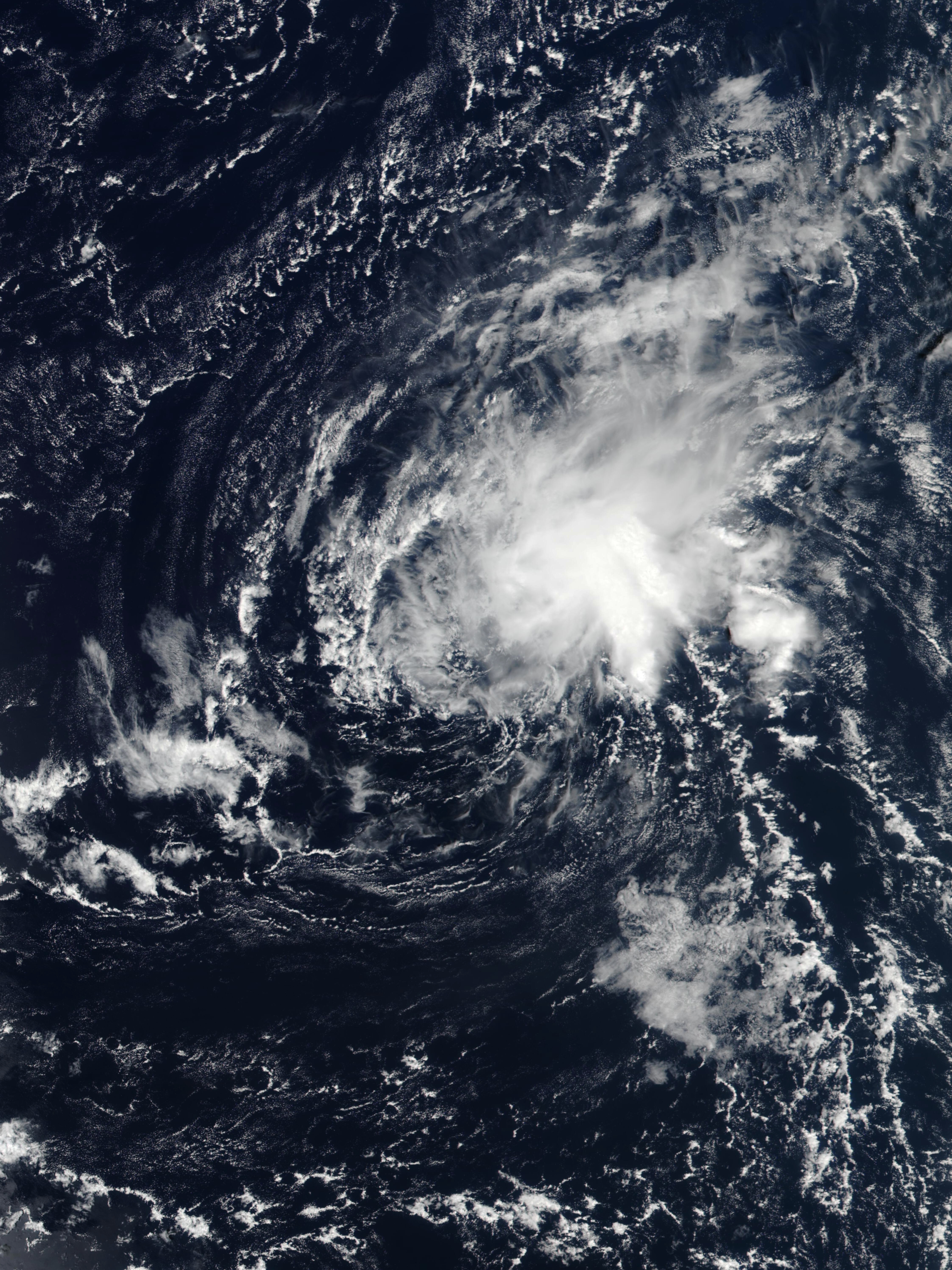
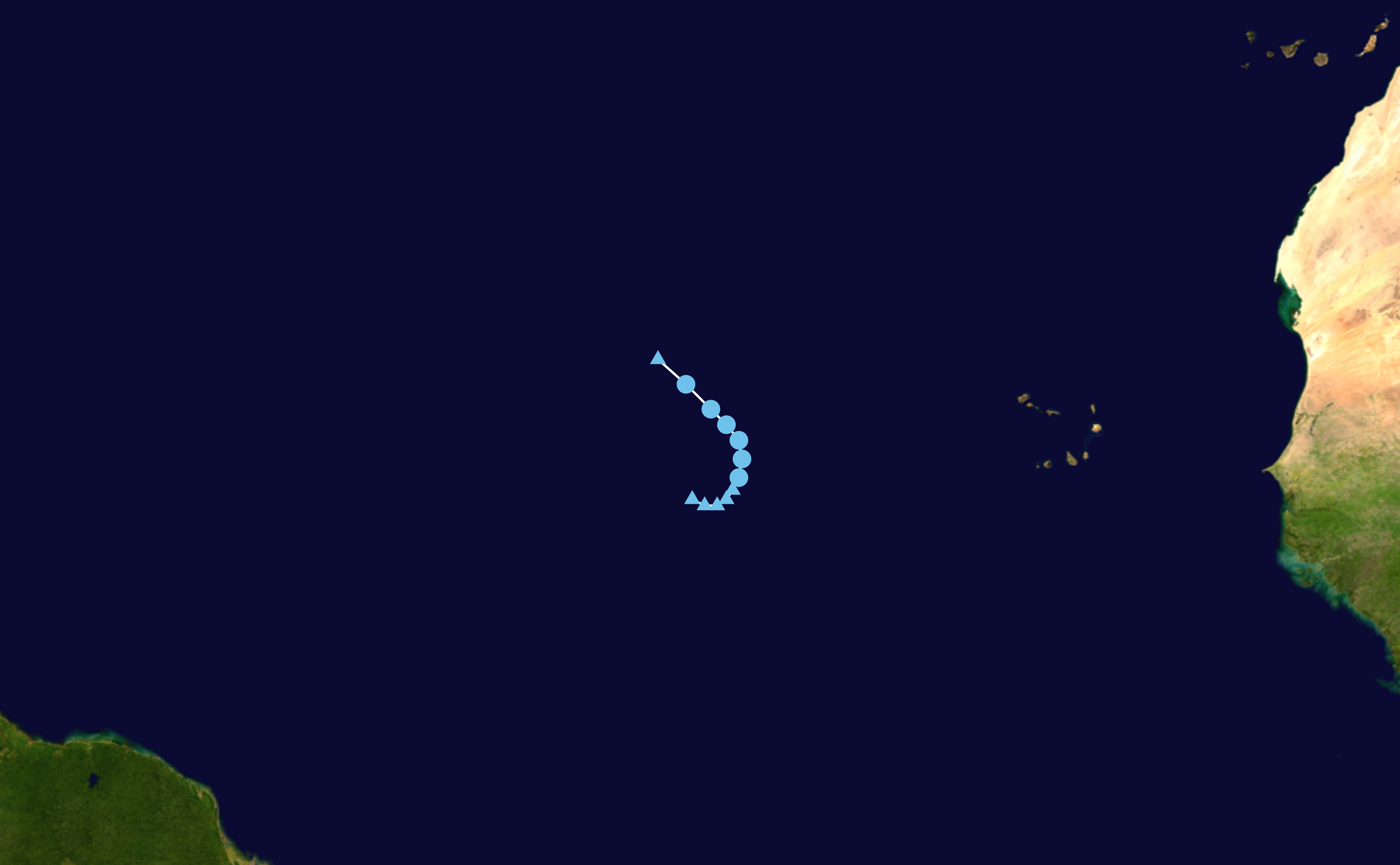
- Duration: September 28 – September 29
- Peak intensity: 35 mph (55 km/h) (1-min); 1008 mbar (hPa)

On September 17, a tropical wave emerged into the Atlantic from the west coast of Africa. After producing disorganized convective activity for the next few days as the wave headed westward, showers and thunderstorms consolidated enough on September 20 that a low-pressure area formed. The system then moved northward due to a break in a mid-level ridge and eastward by September 27 due to a nearby broad trough. Around 00:00 UTC on September 28, the low organized into Tropical Depression Eleven approximately 600 mi (965 km) west of the Cabo Verde Islands. The depression resumed a general northward motion due to the aforementioned ridge. Despite periodic bursts in deep convection, the depression remained poorly organized due to increasing wind shear. Centered about 800 mi (1,285 km) west of the Cabo Verde Islands, the system degenerated into a remnant low by 12:00 UTC on September 29, which soon transitioned into a trough of low pressure.

=== Tropical Depression Twelve ===
- Tropical depression (SSHWS)
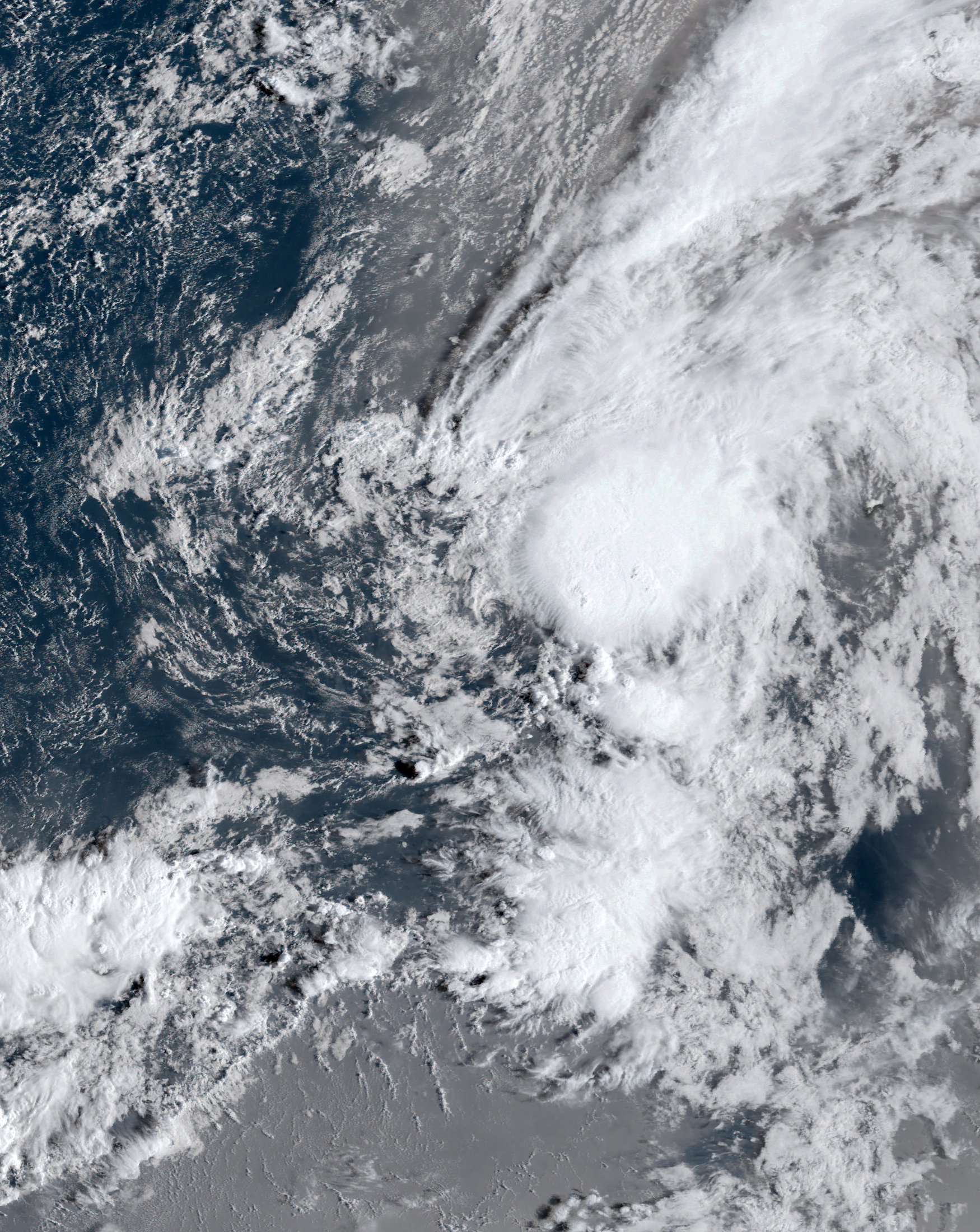
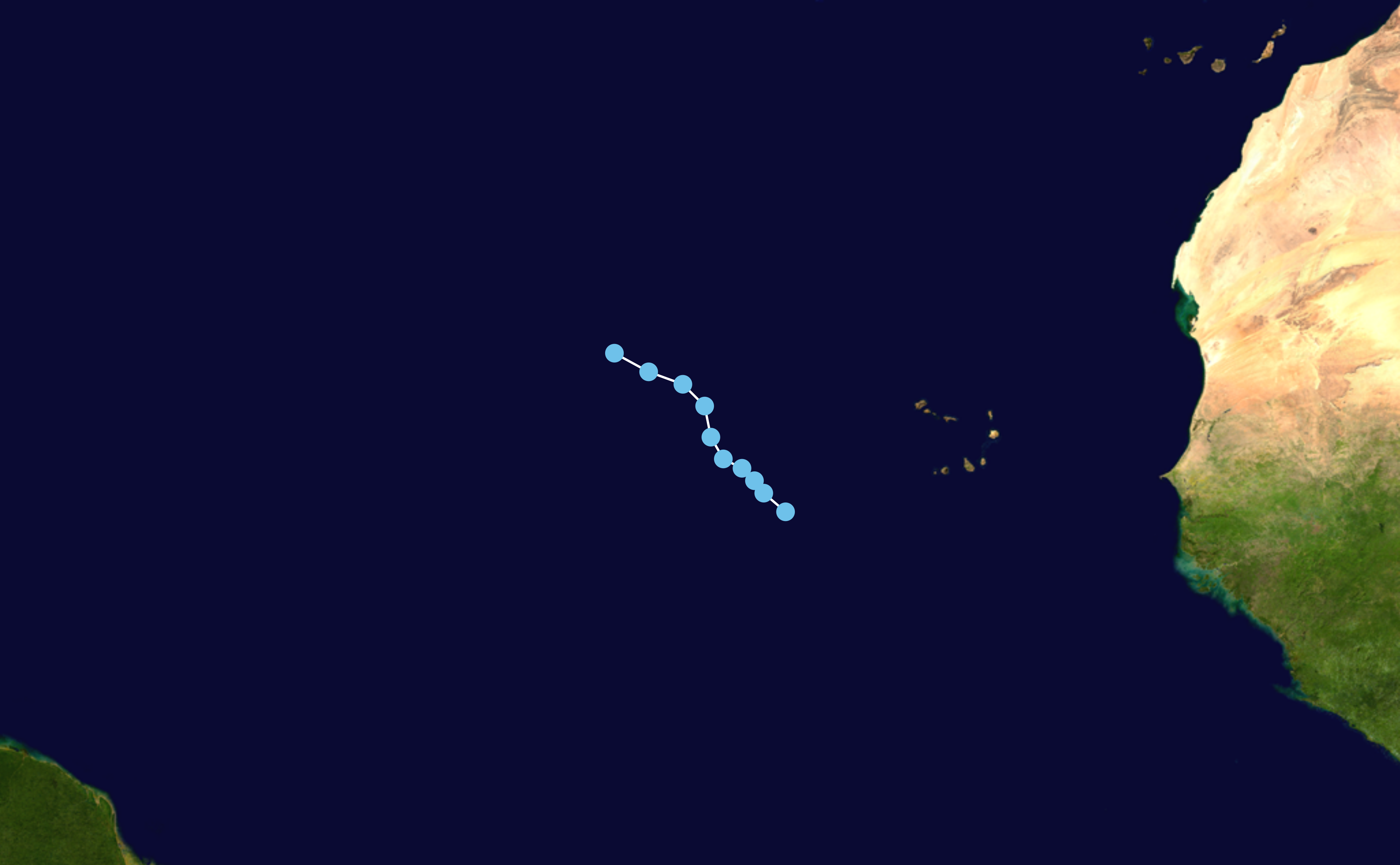
- Duration: October 4 – October 6
- Peak intensity: 35 mph (55 km/h) (1-min); 1007 mbar (hPa)

On September 29, a tropical wave emerged into the Atlantic from the west coast of Africa. Showers and thunderstorms associated with the wave waned during the next few days as it tracked westward. However, a nearby Kelvin wave enhanced the wave's convective activity beginning on October 3. By early the following day, the convection became more concentrated and organized around the center, resulting in the formation of Tropical Depression Twelve around 12:00 UTC about 450 mi (720 km) west-southwest of the Cabo Verde Islands. Moving generally northwestward due to a weakness in a mid-level ridge, the depression encountered strong wind shear, with the center of the cyclone becoming completely exposed from its convection by early the following day. Throughout the day on October 5, the depression's circulation became more elongated. A further increase in wind shear on October 6 caused the depression to degenerate into a surface trough approximately 750 mi (1,205 km) west-northwest of the Cabo Verde Islands. The trough associated with the remnants of the depression became indistinguishable within a few days.

=== Hurricane Julia ===
- Category 1 hurricane (SSHWS)
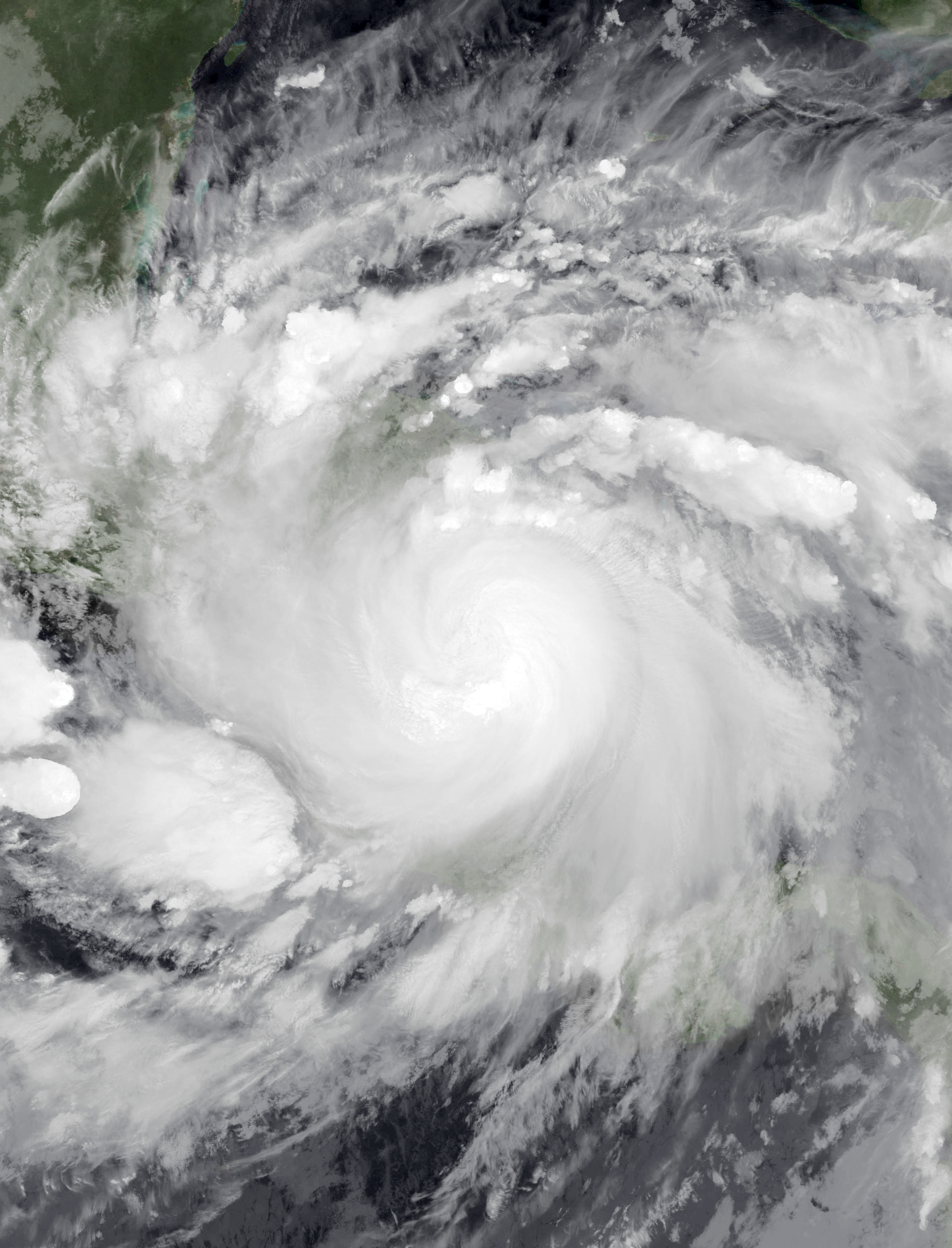
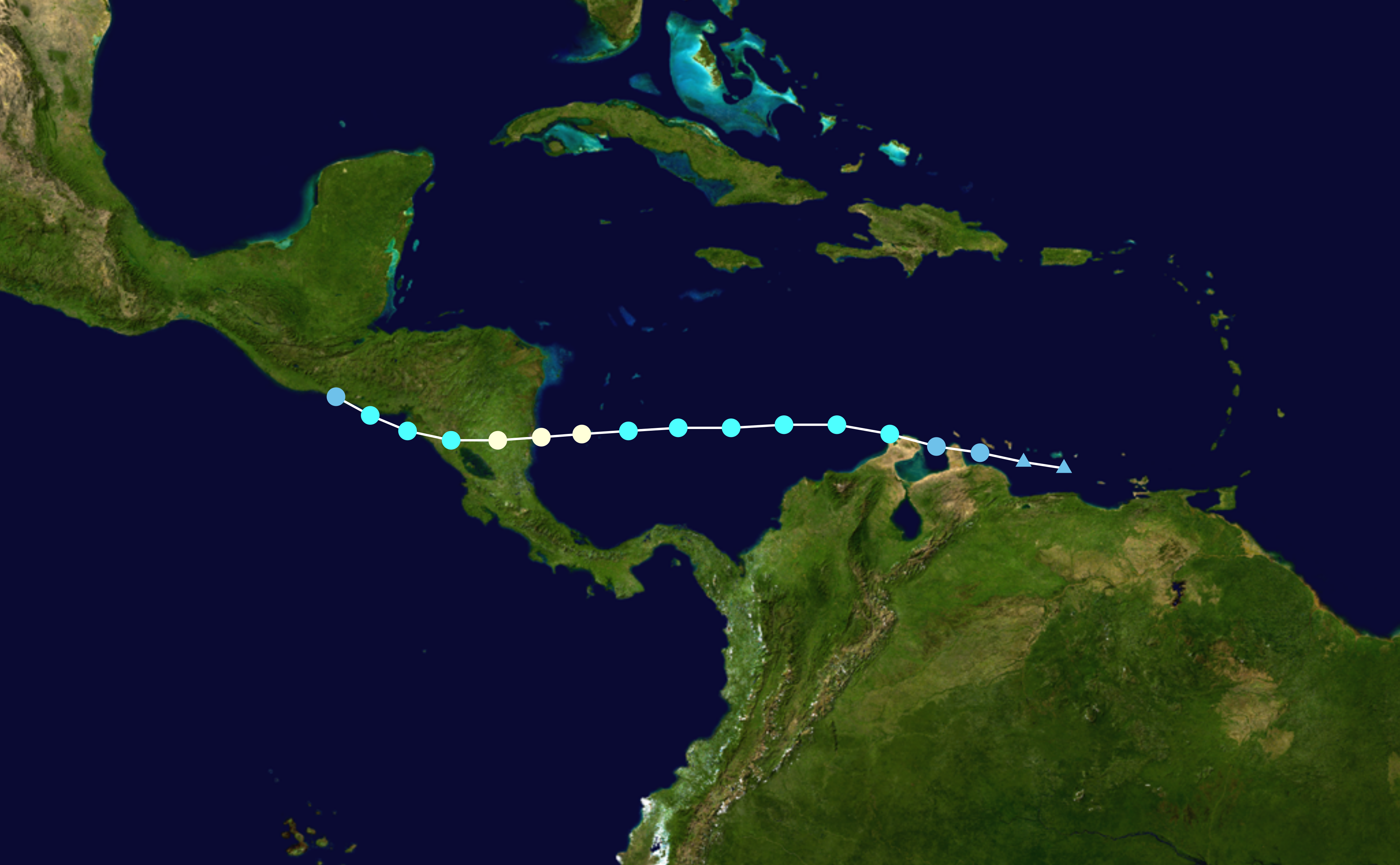
- Duration: October 7 – October 9 (Exited basin)
- Peak intensity: 85 mph (140 km/h) (1-min); 982 mbar (hPa)

A tropical wave emerged into the Atlantic from the west coast of Africa on September 26. While moving westward, the wave remained weak and consisted of little convection for the next few days. Convection became more concentrated as the wave reached the Caribbean, with the system organizing into a tropical depression early on October 7 near Curaçao. A strong burst of deep convection developed near the center of the depression as it moved across the Guajira Peninsula in the early morning of October 7, and soon afterward, it strengthened into Tropical Storm Julia over the adjacent southwestern Caribbean. Thereafter, Julia began moving in a more westward direction along the southern periphery of a building ridge. Low wind shear, high humidity at the mid-levels, and very warm seas caused the storm to intensify into a hurricane at 00:00 UTC on October 9. About six hours later, Julia peaked with maximum sustained winds of 85 mph (140 km/h). The storm then made landfall near Laguna de Perlas, Nicaragua, at 07:15 UTC. Julia's relatively quick movement, as well as its passage across areas comparatively less rugged than to the north, caused the cyclone to only gradually weaken, falling to tropical storm intensity late on October 9. Early the following day, Julia emerged into the Pacific Ocean but quickly dissipated after striking El Salvador several hours later.

On October 5, the disturbance brought heavy thunderstorms to several of the Windward Islands and the Caribbean coast of South America. More than 2 in (51 mm) of rain fell in Trinidad and Tobago in less than a half hour, causing significant flash flooding. A few days later, heavy rainfall occurred in northern areas of Venezuela and Colombia, causing widespread flooding. There were 54 indirect flood fatalities in Venezuela. In Central America, flash flooding and associated mudslides caused widespread damage. Nicaragua suffered extensive flood damage totaling about $400 million. Over 1 million people across the country lost electricity during the storm. Additionally, Costa Rica, Honduras, and Panama reported damage to thousands of homes and significant crop losses. Damage in Panama alone totaled at least $6 million. Altogether, there were at least 89 Julia-related fatalities: 54 in Venezuela, 14 in Guatemala, 10 in El Salvador, 5 in Nicaragua, 4 in Honduras, and 2 in Panama.

=== Tropical Storm Karl ===
- Tropical storm (SSHWS)
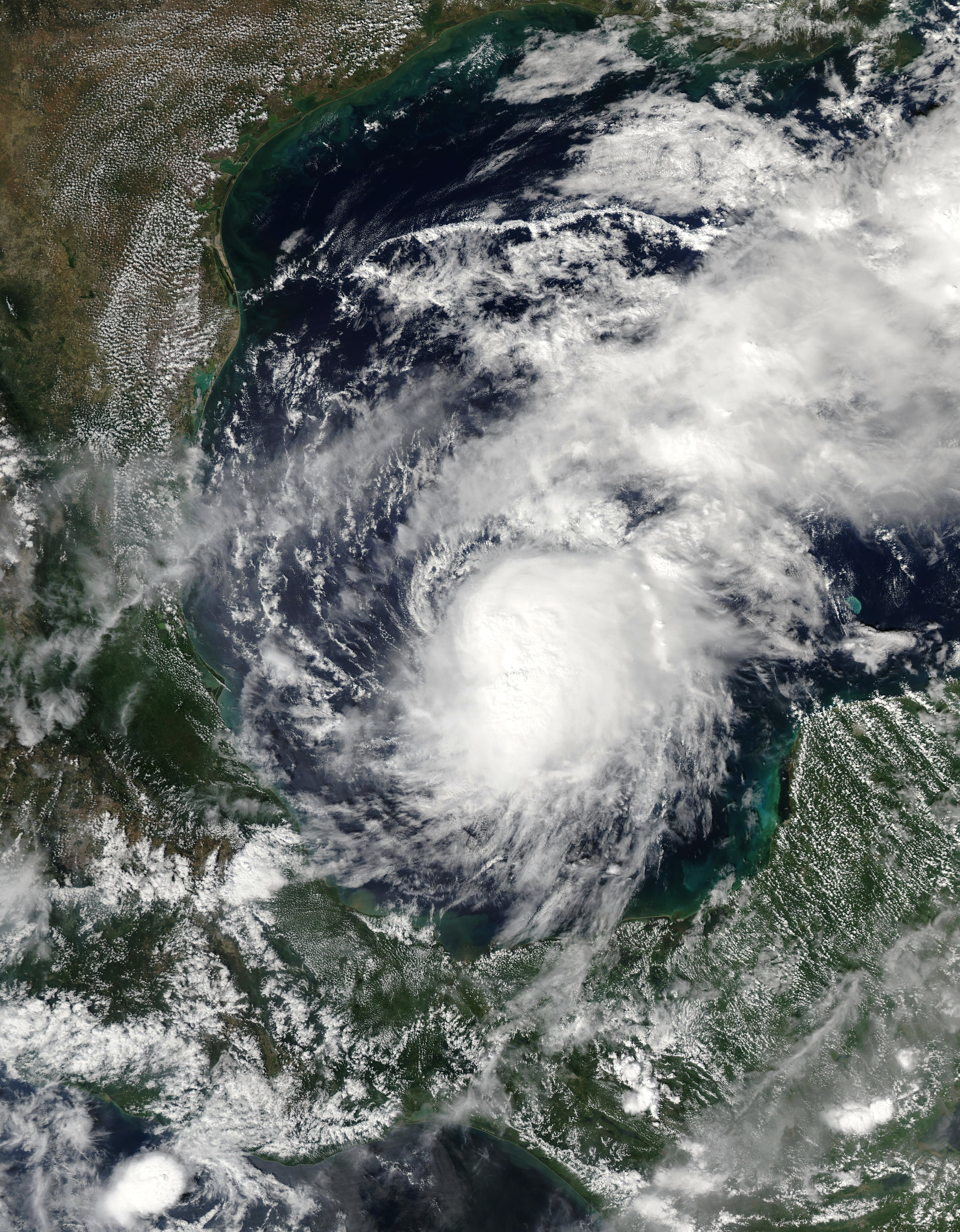
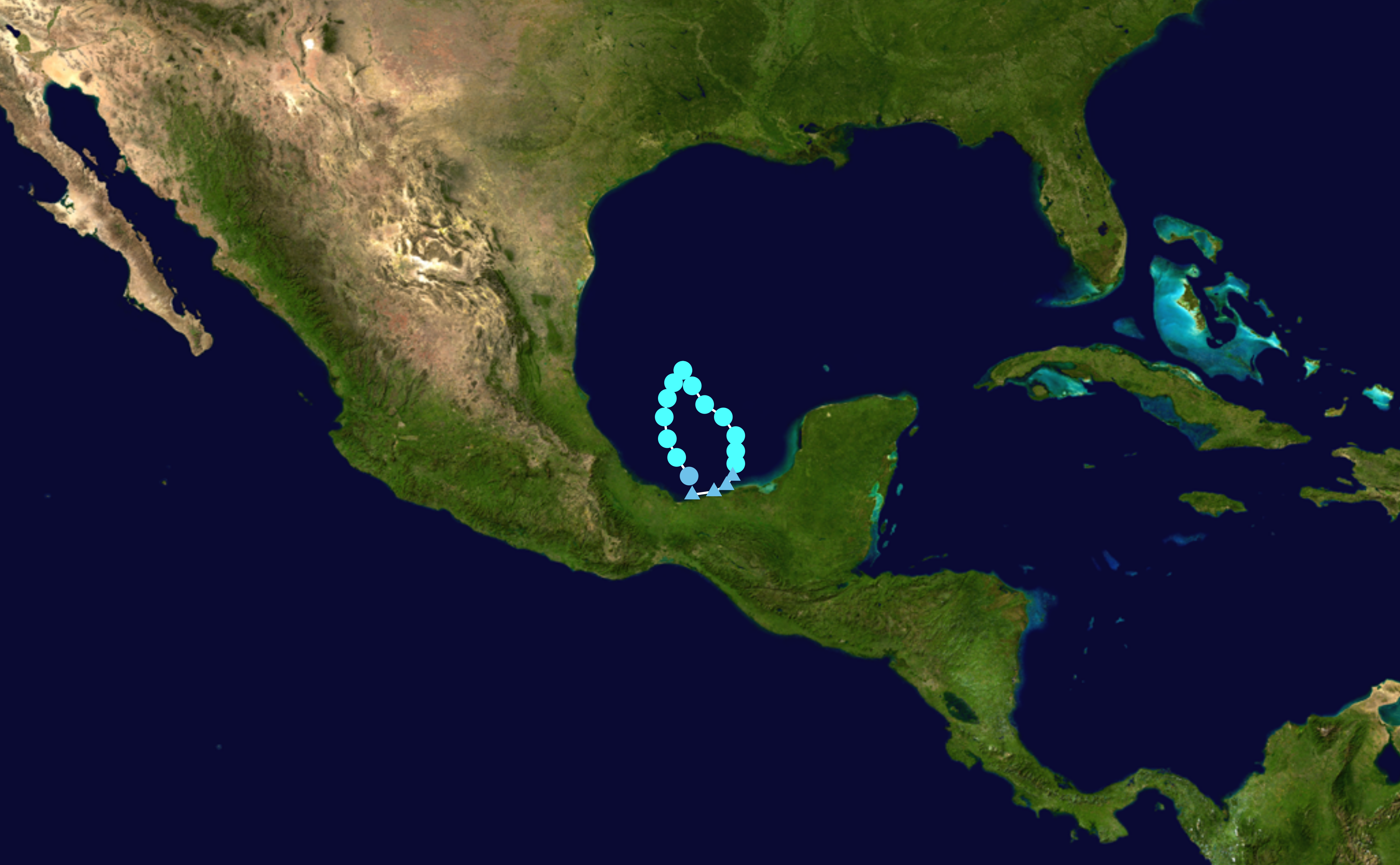
- Duration: October 11 – October 14
- Peak intensity: 60 mph (95 km/h) (1-min); 997 mbar (hPa)

A disturbance associated with the remnants of Julia formed over the Yucatán Peninsula on October 10 and reached the Bay of Campeche on October 11. The system rapidly acquired a well-defined circulation and organized sufficiently to become a tropical depression by 12:00 UTC on October 11, while about 70 mi (110 km) north-northeast of Coatzacoalcos, Veracruz, and strengthened into Tropical Storm Karl six hours later. A Hurricane Hunters mission into the storm on October 12 found that Karl's sustained winds had increased to 60 mph (95 km/h) as it moved slowly northward. However, increasing wind shear began to weaken the storm early on October 13 as it stalled over the southwestern Gulf of Mexico. Nonetheless, Karl's central pressure began to fall slightly after it began moving south-southeastward as the day progressed. Moderate northwesterly shear and drier mid-level air continued to inhibit Karl from strengthening on October 14. Although satellite images that morning showed that the dense overcast around the storm's low-level center had become more symmetric overnight, with its heavy thunderstorms concentrated to the southeast of the center, dry air and wind shear snuffed out all of Karl's deep convection several hours later. Around 00:00 UTC on October 15, Karl degenerated into a remnant low. The remnants of Karl moved towards Tabasco before dissipating about 24 hours later.

Karl caused significant flooding in southern Mexico, which damaged homes, businesses, and bridges throughout the region. The heaviest rainfall occurred in Tabasco and neighboring Chiapas; Camoapa, Tabasco, recorded 15.3 in (387.9 mm) of rain in 24 hours on October 14–15, while Río de Janeiro, Chiapas, recorded 13.5 in (342.4 mm) during that same period. Numerous families had to be evacuated from their homes because of the flooding, which also forced the evacuation of more than a thousand people attending a religious event in Pichucalco, Chiapas. Additionally, three storm-related fatalities were reported in Chiapas: one in Pichucalco and two in Juárez. Losses totaled to MX$1.394 billion (US$76.9 million) from severe flooding.

=== Hurricane Lisa ===
- Category 1 hurricane (SSHWS)
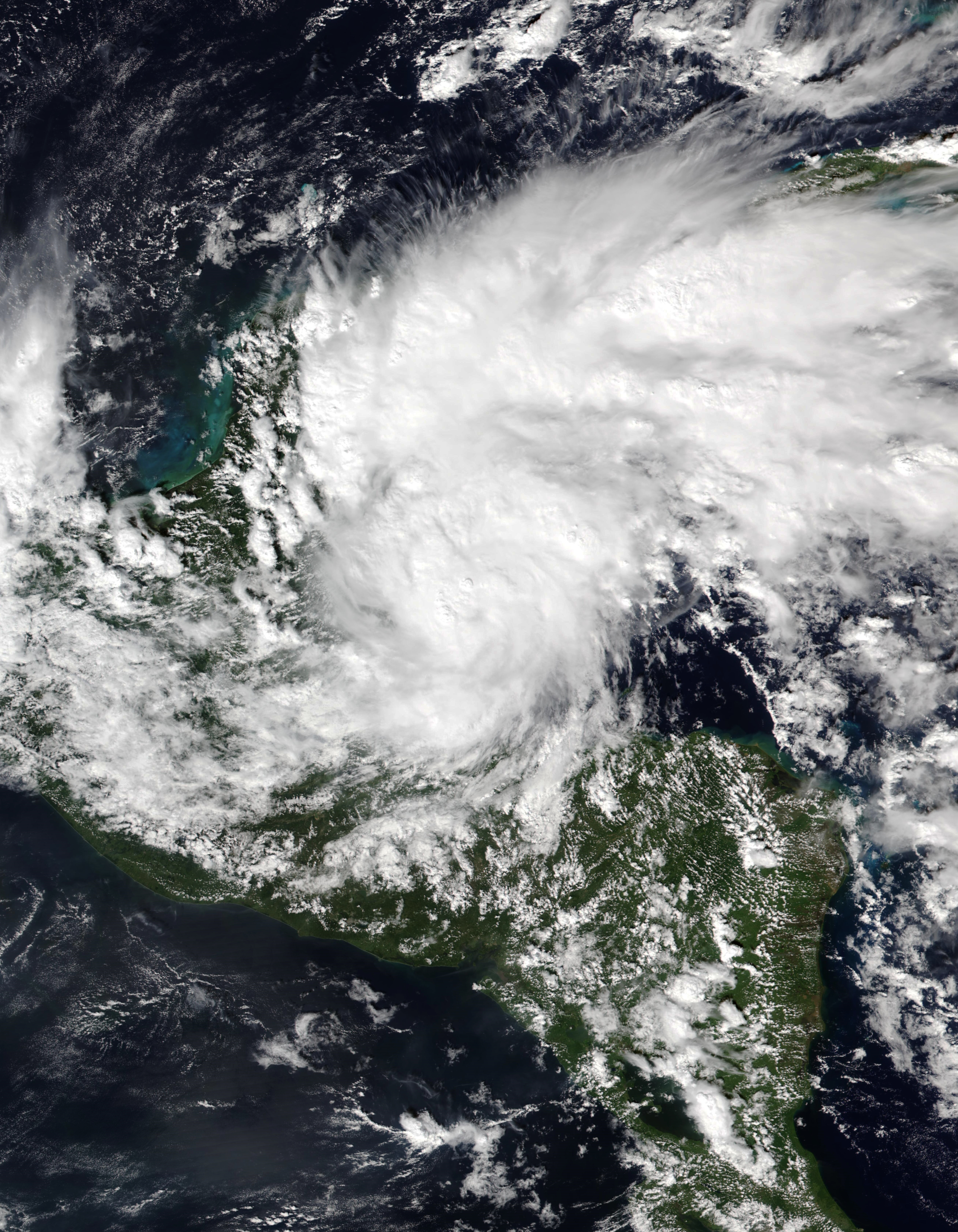
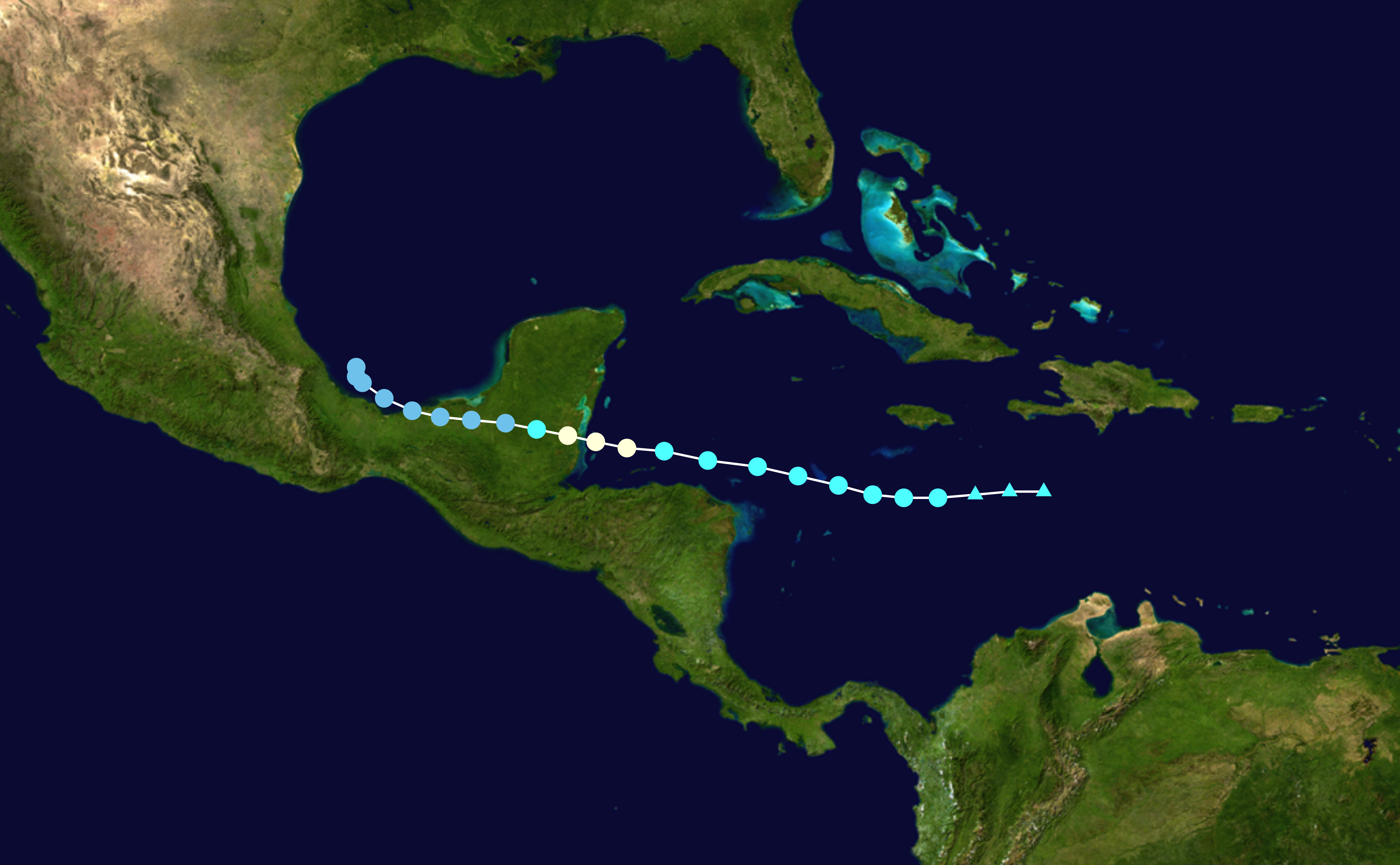
- Duration: October 31 – November 5
- Peak intensity: 90 mph (150 km/h) (1-min); 985 mbar (hPa)

On October 17, a tropical wave emerged into the Atlantic from the west coast of Africa. After crossing the Lesser Antilles and entering the Caribbean on October 25, the wave decelerated. Interaction between the wave and a large mid-level trough spawned a broad low-pressure area on October 28. After convection consolidated and a well-defined center formed, the system developed into Tropical Storm Lisa at 12:00 UTC on October 31 about 175 mi (280 km) south of Kingston, Jamaica. Dry air and wind shear allowed for only gradual intensification, although Lisa reached hurricane status on November 2. The storm strengthened slightly further that day, peaking with winds of 90 mph (150 km/h) and a minimum pressure of 985 mbar (29.1 inHg) while making landfall in Belize near the mouth of the Sibun River at 21:30 UTC. Lisa initially weakened quickly over the Yucatán Peninsula, falling to tropical storm intensity around 06:00 UTC on November 3 and then to tropical depression status six hours later. Despite Lisa emerging into the Gulf of Mexico early the following day, unfavorable conditions caused the storm to degenerate into a trough of low-pressure by 12:00 UTC on November 5 about 100 mi (160 km) northeast of Veracruz.

Passing over Belize City as it made landfall on November 2, Lisa generated high winds that knocked down trees and electric poles, and damaged several homes; some structures collapsed completely. Additionally, storm surge and heavy precipitation inundated many areas of the city. Altogether, the 12 shelters set up in Belize City housed 1,221 people. Throughout Belize, the hurricane destroyed about 500 homes and damaged around 5,000 others. Damage in the country totaled roughly $100 million. In Guatemala, Lisa caused flooding and a landslide, which damaged homes and property. About 143 people in the municipalities of Melchor de Mencos and San José were evacuated to shelters. Lisa also brought heavy rains to southern Mexico.

=== Hurricane Martin ===
- Category 1 hurricane (SSHWS)
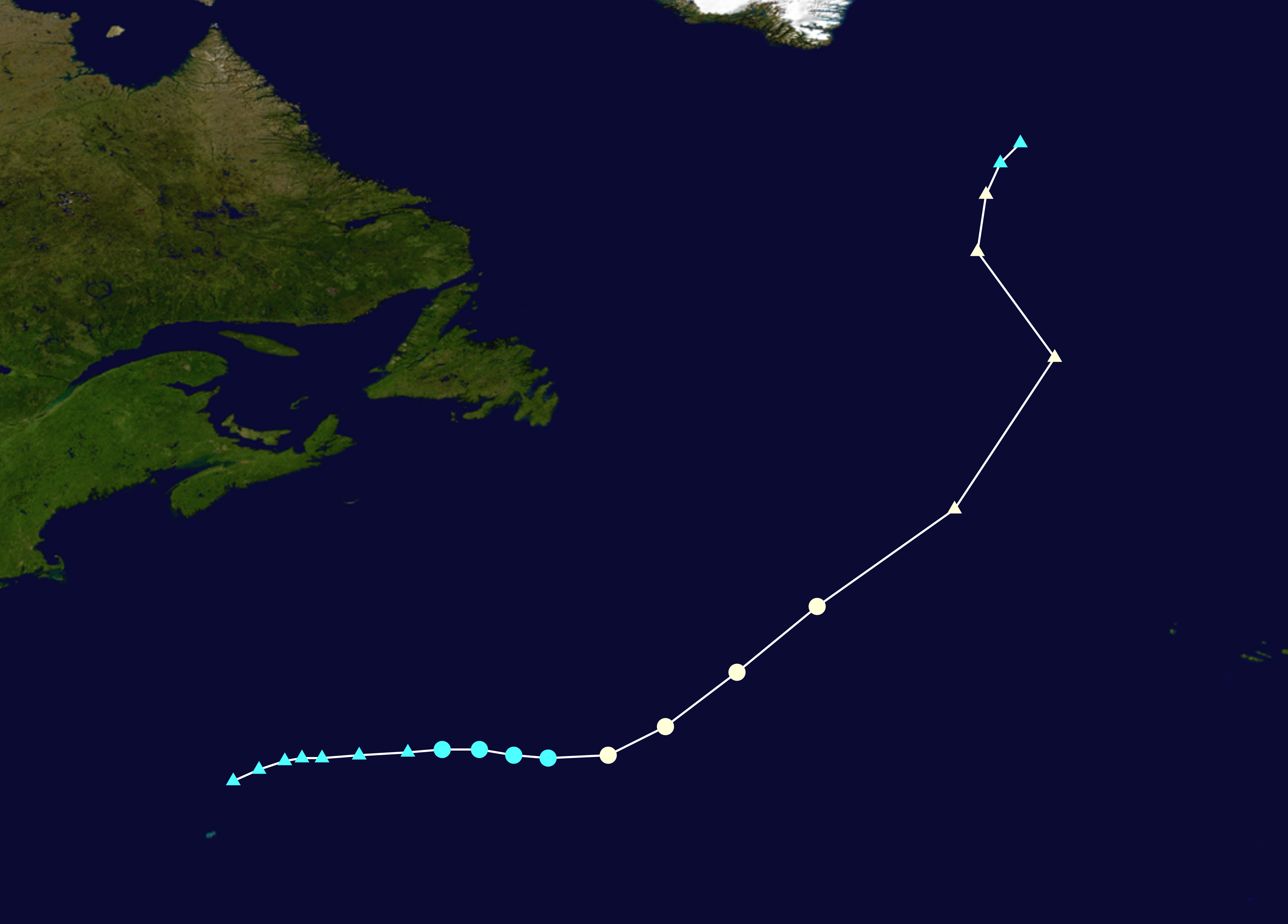
- Duration: November 1 – November 3
- Peak intensity: 85 mph (140 km/h) (1-min); 965 mbar (hPa)

A surface trough formed on October 25 about halfway between the Bahamas and Bermuda, partially due to a nearby upper-level shortwave trough. Three days later, a non-tropical low-pressure area formed along the surface trough. Although the low merged with a frontal boundary early on October 30, its remnants caused the development of an extratropical cyclone several hours later. By November 1, the extratropical system had shed its frontal characteristics and developed more deep convection. Consequently, Tropical Storm Martin formed about 550 mi (885 km) east-northeast of Bermuda around 12:00 UTC on November 1. Despite only marginally favorable sea temperatures and mid-level moisture, cold upper-level temperatures allowed the storm to strengthen gradually, becoming a Category 1 hurricane about 24 hours later as a ragged eye appeared on satellite imagery. At 06:00 UTC on November 3, Martin peaked with sustained winds of 85 mph (140 km/h) and a minimum pressure of 965 mbar (28.5 inHg). However, the storm became extratropical just six hours later approximately 730 mi (1,175 km) east of Cape Race, Newfoundland, due to its interaction with an approaching cold front. The remnants of Martin moved rapidly northward until being absorbed by a larger extratropical system southeast of Greenland early on November 5.

=== Hurricane Nicole ===
- Category 1 hurricane (SSHWS)
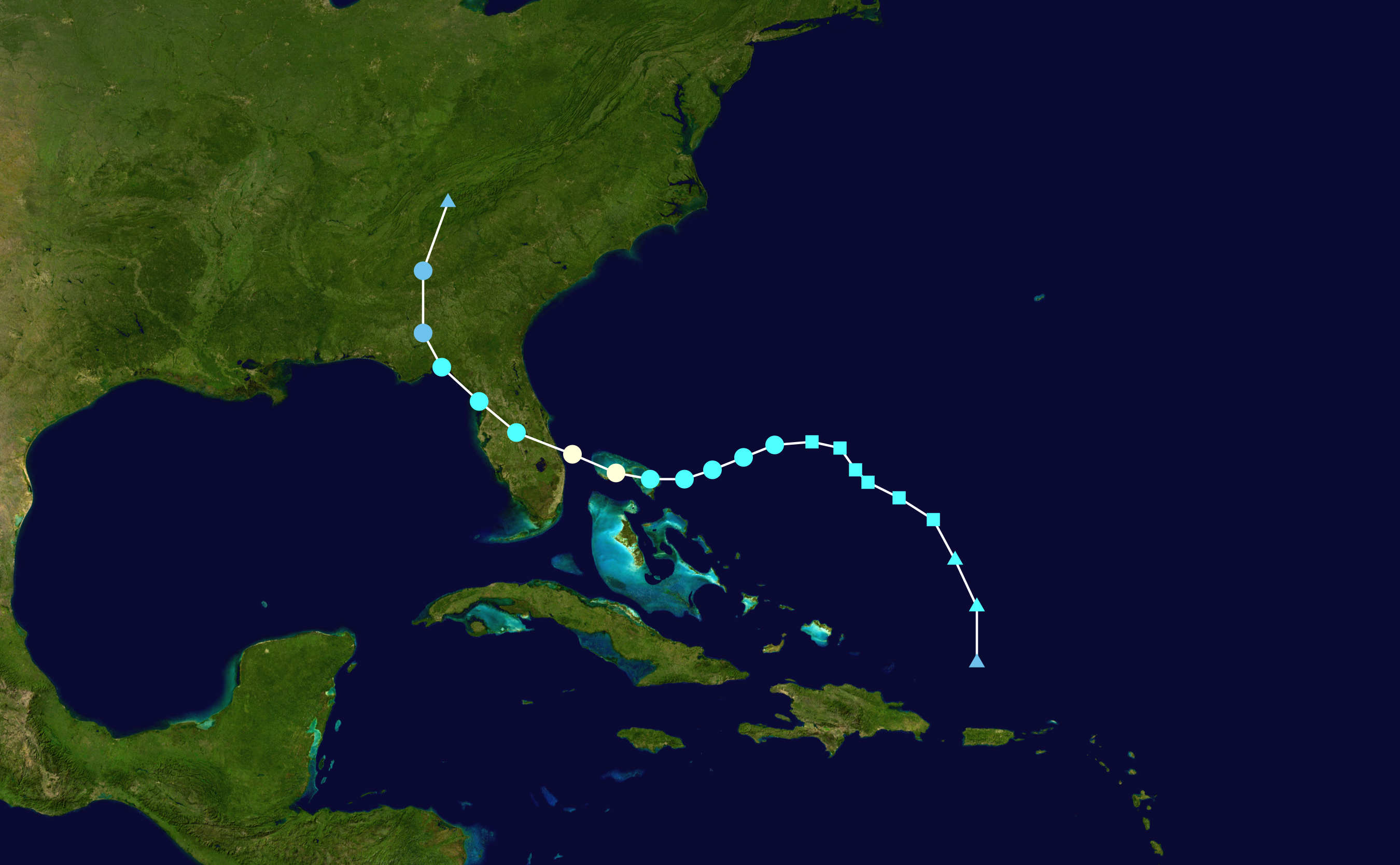
- Duration: November 7 – November 11
- Peak intensity: 75 mph (120 km/h) (1-min); 980 mbar (hPa)

A mid to upper-level trough crossed into western Atlantic from northeastern United States on November 3. After the trough interacted with the Intertropical Convergence Zone on the following day, a large area of convection formed between the eastern Caribbean to just north of the Lesser Antilles. On November 5, a broad low developed just south of Hispaniola, before re-forming north of Puerto Rico on the next day. A further increase in convection led to the formation of Subtropical Storm Nicole early on November 7, roughly 540 mi (870 km) south-southwest of Bermuda. The system initially moved northwestward due to a low to mid-level ridge, before a cold front caused it to move westward to west-southwestward beginning on November 8. Convection consolidated further around the center, resulting in Nicole transitioning into a tropical storm around 18:00 UTC. At 17:00 UTC on November 9, Nicole struck Marsh Harbour, Great Abaco Island, Bahamas, with winds of 70 mph (110 km/h). Several hours later, the storm strengthened into a Category 1 hurricane while simultaneously striking Grand Bahama with winds of 75 mph (120 km/h). At 07:45 UTC on November 10, Nicole made landfall near Vero Beach, Florida, at the same intensity. Nicole quickly weakened to a tropical storm while crossing Central Florida. Later on November 10, the storm briefly emerged into the Gulf of Mexico near Crystal River, before striking Cedar Key and then the mouth of the Aucilla River early the next day. Crossing into southwestern Georgia, the cyclone fell to tropical depression status. By 18:00 UTC on November 11, a mid-latitude trough absorbed Nicole over eastern North Carolina.

Nicole and its precursor produced heavy rainfall over the Leeward Islands, Puerto Rico, Hispaniola, and the Bahamas. In the Dominican Republic, flooding resulted in six deaths, damaged several hundred homes, and caused extensive agricultural losses. Precipitation totals in Florida generally ranged from 3 to 6 in (76 to 152 mm), leading to only minor flooding. With few observations of hurricane-force winds, mostly light wind damage occurred, although more than 300,000 businesses and households lost electricity due to the storm. However, days of strong on-shore wind flow onto the east coast of Florida produced storm surge that caused severe beach erosion, especially in Brevard, Flagler, St. Johns, and Volusia counties. At least 107 structures suffered damage in Brevard County, with 10 deemed unsafe for occupancy. In Volusia County, almost 50 condominiums collapsed or were at risk of collapsing. Flagler County reported coastal flood damage, along with a loss of about 1,000,000 cubic yards (760,000 m^{3}) of beach sand and sand dunes. A total of 299 structures experienced some degree of impact in St. Johns County, mostly due to erosion. Five indirect deaths occurred in Florida. Nicole and its remnants produced widespread, but mostly light precipitation across the Southeastern United States before being absorbed by the frontal system, although 7.88 in (200 mm) of rain fell near Foscoe, North Carolina. Storm surge caused coastal flooding as far north as Charleston, South Carolina. Damage throughout the United States totaled approximately $1 billion.

=== Other system ===
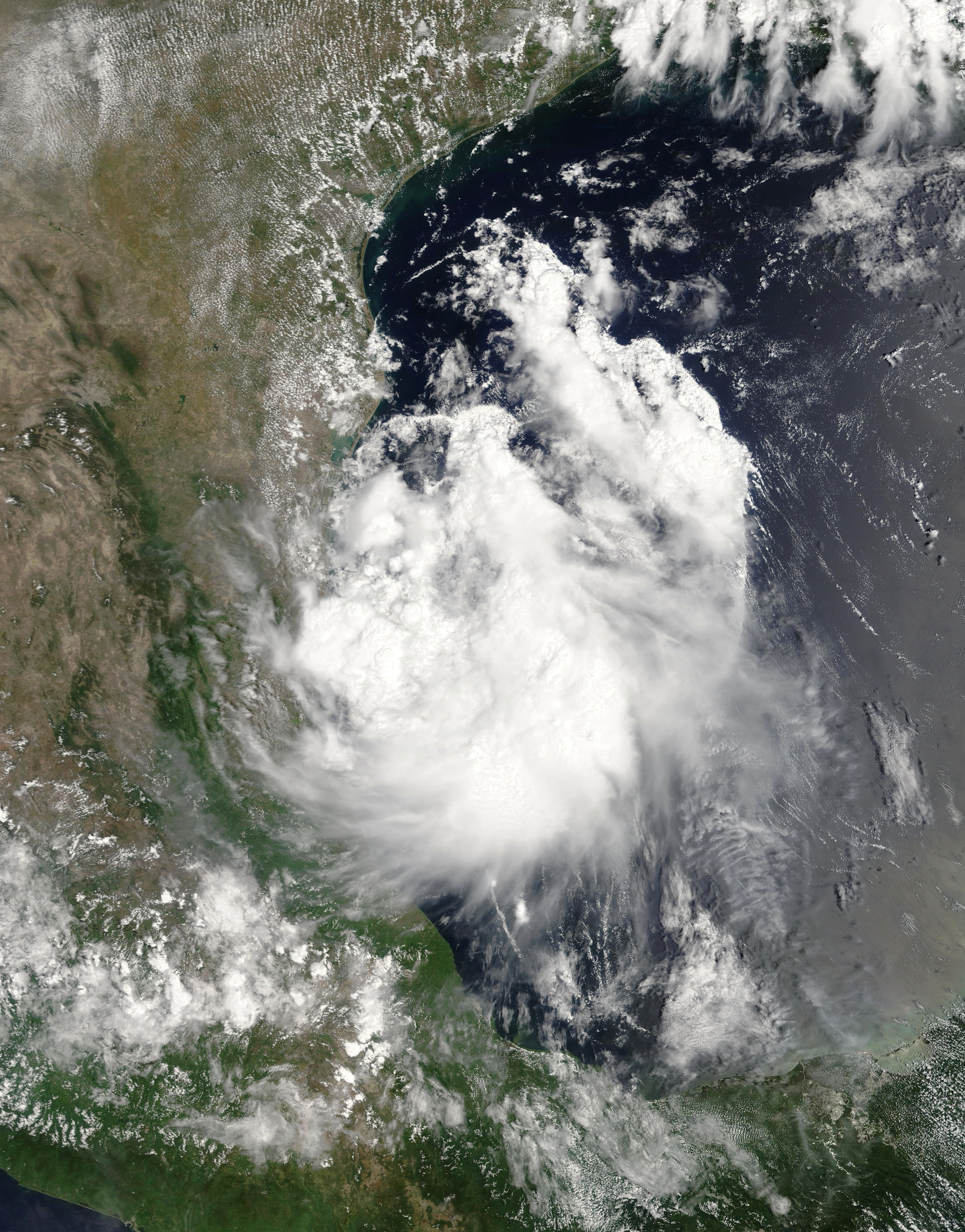
Potential Tropical Cyclone Four off the northeastern coast of Mexico on August 20

On August 15, the NHC first noted the potential for tropical cyclone development in the southwestern Gulf of Mexico from a tropical wave that was located over the central Caribbean. The low emerged over the Gulf early on August 19 producing disorganized showers. Due to the threat the developing system posed to northeastern Mexico and South Texas, the NHC initiated advisories on it as Potential Tropical Cyclone Four at 21:00 UTC that same day. As the disturbance moved northwestward toward the Gulf coast of Mexico on August 20, a Hurricane Hunters mission found that it was still a surface trough. Later that day, it moved inland, crossing the coast about 60 mi (95 km) southwest of the mouth of the Rio Grande. With that, the window of opportunity for tropical development closed, and the NHC issued its last advisory on the system at 03:00 UTC on August 21. The disturbance brought heavy rain to coastal Tamaulipas and coastal South Texas, but left no significant impacts.

== Storm names ==
The following list of names was used for named storms that formed in the North Atlantic in 2022. This is the same list used in the 2016 season, with the exceptions of Martin and Owen, which replaced Matthew and Otto, respectively. The name Martin was used for the first time this season.

- Alex
- Bonnie
- Colin
- Danielle
- Earl
- Fiona
- Gaston
- Hermine
- Ian
- Julia
- Karl
- Lisa
- Martin
- Nicole
- Owen (unused)
- Paula (unused)
- Richard (unused)
- Shary (unused)
- Tobias (unused)
- Virginie (unused)
- Walter (unused)

=== Retirement ===
On March 29, 2023, during the 45th Session of the RA IV Hurricane Committee, the World Meteorological Organization retired the names Fiona and Ian from its rotating name lists due to the number of deaths and amount of damage each one caused, and they will not be used again in the North Atlantic basin. They were replaced with Farrah and Idris, respectively, and will first appear on the 2028 season list.

== Season effects ==
This is a table of all of the tropical cyclones that formed in the 2022 Atlantic hurricane season. It includes their name, duration, peak classification and intensities, areas affected, damage, and death totals. Deaths in parentheses are additional and indirect (an example of an indirect death would be a traffic accident), but were still related to that storm. Damage and deaths include totals while the storm was extratropical, a wave, or a low, and all of the damage figures are in 2022 USD.

Saffir–Simpson scale
| TD | TS | C1 | C2 | C3 | C4 | C5 |

2022 North Atlantic tropical cyclone season statistics
| Storm name | Dates active | Storm category at peak intensity | Max 1-min wind mph (km/h) | Min. press. (mbar) | Areas affected | Damage (US$) | Deaths | Ref(s). |
|---|---|---|---|---|---|---|---|---|
| Alex | June 5–6 | Tropical storm | 70 (110) | 984 | Yucatán Peninsula, Western Cuba, Florida, Northern Bahamas, Bermuda | $408 million | 4 | |
| Bonnie | July 1–2 | Tropical storm | 60 (95) | 996 | Trinidad and Tobago, Grenada, ABC Islands, Venezuela, Colombia, San Andres Island, Costa Rica, Nicaragua (before crossover) | $25 million | 5 | |
| Colin | July 1–2 | Tropical storm | 40 (65) | 1011 | Southeastern United States (South Carolina) | Minimal | 1 | |
| Danielle | September 1–8 | Category 1 hurricane | 85 (140) | 972 | Western Iberian Peninsula | Unknown | None | |
| Earl | September 2–10 | Category 2 hurricane | 110 (175) | 948 | Northern Leeward Islands, Puerto Rico, Bermuda, Newfoundland | Minimal | 2 | |
| Fiona | September 14–23 | Category 4 hurricane | 140 (220) | 931 | Lesser Antilles (Guadeloupe), Puerto Rico, Dominican Republic, Eastern Bahamas, Turks and Caicos Islands, Bermuda, Eastern Canada | ≥$3.59 billion | 29 | |
| Gaston | September 20–25 | Tropical storm | 65 (100) | 994 | Azores | Minimal | None | |
| Ian | September 23–30 | Category 5 hurricane | 160 (260) | 937 | Trinidad and Tobago, Venezuela, Colombia, ABC islands, Jamaica, Cayman Islands, Cuba, Southeastern United States (Florida and South Carolina) | $112 billion | 161 | |
| Hermine | September 23–24 | Tropical storm | 40 (65) | 1003 | Canary Islands | $9.8 million | None | |
| Eleven | September 28–29 | Tropical depression | 35 (55) | 1008 | None | None | None | |
| Twelve | October 4–6 | Tropical depression | 35 (55) | 1007 | None | None | None | |
| Julia | October 7–9 | Category 1 hurricane | 85 (140) | 982 | Trinidad and Tobago, Venezuela, ABC Islands, Colombia, Central America (Nicaragua; before crossover) | >$762 million | 35 (54) | |
| Karl | October 11–14 | Tropical storm | 60 (95) | 997 | Southern Mexico | $76.9 million | 3 | |
| Lisa | October 31 – November 5 | Category 1 hurricane | 90 (150) | 985 | Jamaica, Cayman Islands, Central America (Belize) | $100 million | None | |
| Martin | November 1–3 | Category 1 hurricane | 85 (140) | 965 | None | None | None | |
| Nicole | November 7–11 | Category 1 hurricane | 75 (120) | 980 | Greater Antilles, Bahamas, Southeastern United States | $1 billion | 0 (11) | |
Season aggregates
| 16 systems | June 5 – November 11 | | 160 (260) | 931 | | >$118 billion | 240 (65) | |

== See also ==
- Weather of 2022
- Tropical cyclones in 2022
- 2022 Pacific hurricane season
- 2022 Pacific typhoon season
- 2022 North Indian Ocean cyclone season
- South-West Indian Ocean cyclone seasons: 2021–22, 2022–23
- Australian region cyclone seasons: 2021–22, 2022–23
- South Pacific cyclone seasons: 2021–22, 2022–23
