= 2021–22 South Pacific cyclone season =

Cyclone season in the South Pacific Ocean

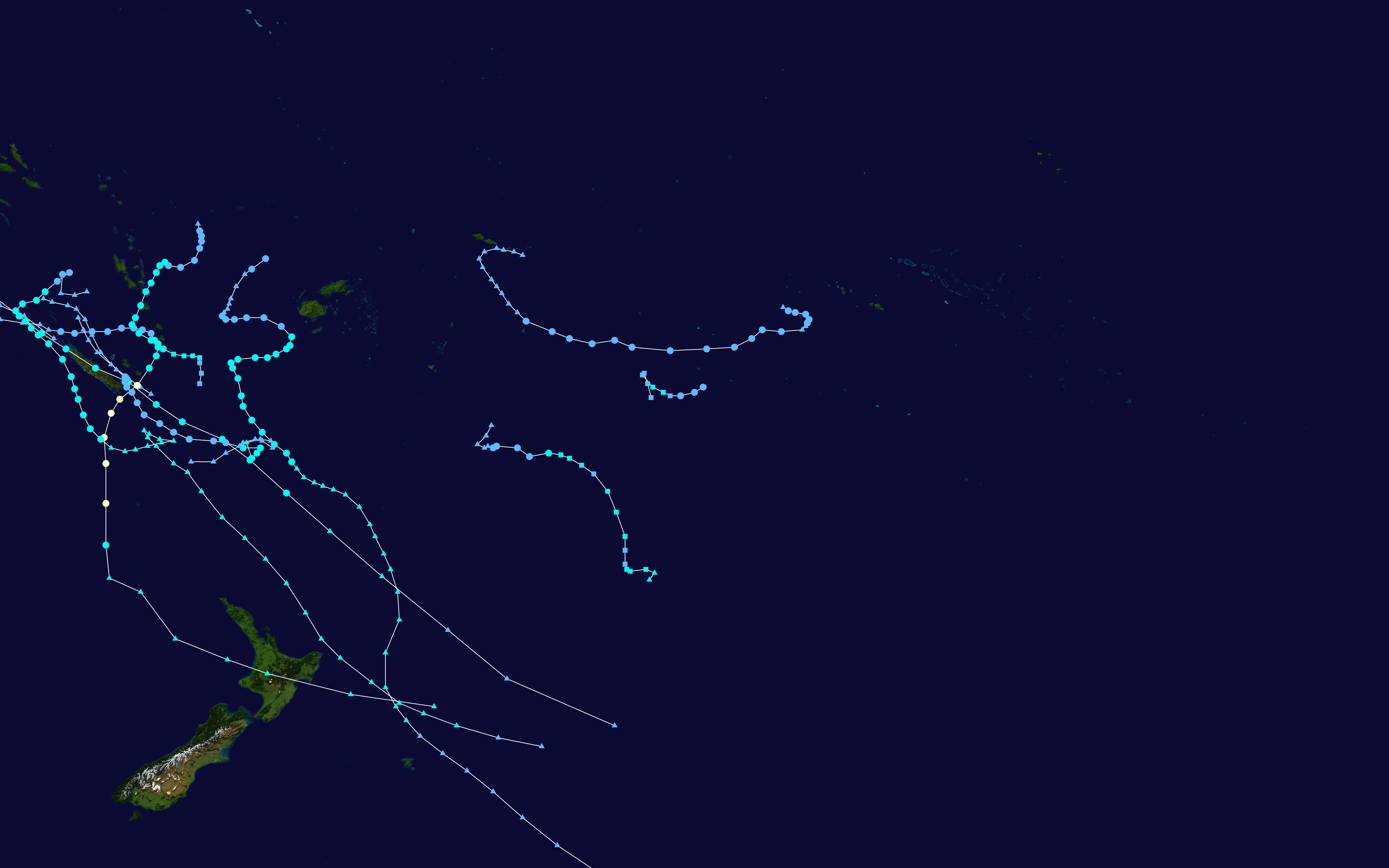
- Season summary map

Seasonal boundaries
- First system formed: December 13, 2021
- Last system dissipated: May 21, 2022

Strongest storm
- Name: Dovi
  - Maximum winds: 175 km/h (110 mph) (10-minute sustained)
  - Lowest pressure: 940 hPa (mbar)

Seasonal statistics
- Total disturbances: 11 official, 1 unofficial
- Total depressions: 7 official, 1 unofficial
- Tropical cyclones: 6 official, 1 unofficial
- Severe tropical cyclones: 2
- Total fatalities: 2 total
- Total damage: $96.9 million (2021 USD)

Related articles
- 2021–22 Australian region cyclone season; 2021–22 South-West Indian Ocean cyclone season

The 2021–22 South Pacific cyclone season was a near average tropical cyclone season within the South Pacific Ocean to the east of 160°E. The season officially started from November 1, 2021, and officially ended on April 30, 2022, however a tropical cyclone could form at any time between July 1, 2021, and June 30, 2022, and would count towards the season total. During the season, tropical cyclones will be officially monitored by the Fiji Meteorological Service, Australian Bureau of Meteorology and New Zealand's MetService. The United States Armed Forces through the Joint Typhoon Warning Center (JTWC) will also monitor the basin and issue unofficial warnings for American interests. The FMS attaches a number and an F suffix to tropical disturbances that form in or move into the basin while the JTWC designates significant tropical cyclones with a number and a P suffix. The BoM, FMS and MetService all use the Australian Tropical Cyclone Intensity Scale and estimate windspeeds over a period of ten minutes, while the JTWC estimated sustained winds over a 1-minute period, which are subsequently compared to the Saffir–Simpson hurricane wind scale (SSHWS).

== Seasonal forecasts ==
Source/Record	Region	Tropical Cyclones	Severe Tropical Cyclones	Refs
Records
Average (1969–70 – 2020–21):	160°E – 120°W	7	3	
Record high:	160°E – 120°W	1997–98: 16	1982–83: 10	
Record low:	160°E – 120°W	1990–91: 2	2008–09: 0	
Predictions
CWCL July	135°E – 120°W	7–11	—N/a	
CWCL August	135°E – 120°W	8–12	—N/a	
CWCL September	135°E – 120°W	9–11	—N/a	
CWCL October	135°E – 120°W	9–11	—N/a	
CWCL November	135°E – 120°W	9–12	—N/a	
CWCL December	135°E – 120°W	6–10	—N/a	
CWCL January	135°E – 120°W	3–7	—N/a	
NIWA October	135°E – 120°W	9–12	3–4	
FMS Whole	160°E – 120°W	4–6	1–3	

Ahead of the cyclone season formally starting, the Fiji Meteorological Service (FMS), Australian Bureau of Meteorology (BoM), New Zealand's MetService and National Institute of Water and Atmospheric Research (NIWA) and various other Pacific Meteorological services, all contributed towards the Island Climate Update tropical cyclone outlook that was released during October 2021. The outlook took into account the ENSO neutral conditions that had been observed across the Pacific and analogue seasons, that had ENSO neutral and La Nina conditions occurring during the season. The outlook called for a near-average number of tropical cyclones for the 2021–22 season, with nine to twelve named tropical cyclones, predicted to occur between 135°E and 120°W, compared to an average of just over 10. At least four of the tropical cyclones were expected to intensify further and become severe tropical cyclones, while it was noted that a Category 5 severe tropical cyclone could occur during the season.

In addition to contributing towards the Island Climate Update outlook, the FMS and the BoM issued their own seasonal forecasts for the South Pacific region. The BoM issued two seasonal forecasts for the Southern Pacific Ocean, for their self-defined eastern and western regions of the South Pacific Ocean. They predicted that the Western region between 142.5°E and 165°E, had a 59% chance of seeing activity above its average of 4 tropical cyclones. The BoM also predicted that the Eastern Region between 165°E and 120°W, had a 46% chance of seeing activity above its average of 6 tropical cyclones. Within their outlook the FMS predicted that between four and six tropical cyclones would occur within the basin compared to an average of around 7. At least one of these tropical cyclones was expected to intensify further and become a Category 3 or higher severe tropical cyclone.

== Seasonal summary ==
The season began on mid-December 2021 with the arrival of Tropical Cyclone Ruby from the Australian region as a Category 2 tropical cyclone, before making landfall in New Caledonia and dissipate. Tropical Disturbance 02F then developed late on the same month between Vanuatu and Fiji and moved westwards towards New Caledonia before dissipating. By January, Tropical Disturbance 03F formed, which would later become Severe Tropical Cyclone Cody. Cody then moved near Fiji before moving southwards again and weaken. Three more systems would later form during the month, with the first system, 04F, becoming a tropical depression as it moved west before weakening. The second system, 05F, developed between the southern Cook Islands and French Polynesia and remained a tropical disturbance. The third system, 06F, formed between Vanuatu and New Caledonia and also remained a tropical disturbance while moving southeast.

By February, Tropical Low 16U moved over the basin from the Australian region, and was redesignated as Tropical Disturbance 07F. It remained as a disturbance while moving southeast. Tropical Low 18U would also move over the basin, and be redesignated as 08F. 08F would later develop into Severe Tropical Cyclone Dovi, the strongest cyclone of the season. Dovi would later affect New Zealand as an extratropical cyclone. Late on the same month, Tropical Disturbance 09F would form near New Caledonia, and intensify into Tropical Cyclone Eva. Tropical Cyclone Fili would later form on the month of April, peaking as a Category 2 tropical cyclone before moving near New Caledonia and dissipating, and Tropical Cyclone Gina would form in the off-season, in the month of May, peaking as a Category 1 tropical cyclone before dissipating.

== Systems ==
=== Tropical Cyclone Ruby ===
- Category 2 tropical cyclone (Australian scale)
- Category 1 tropical cyclone (SSHWS)
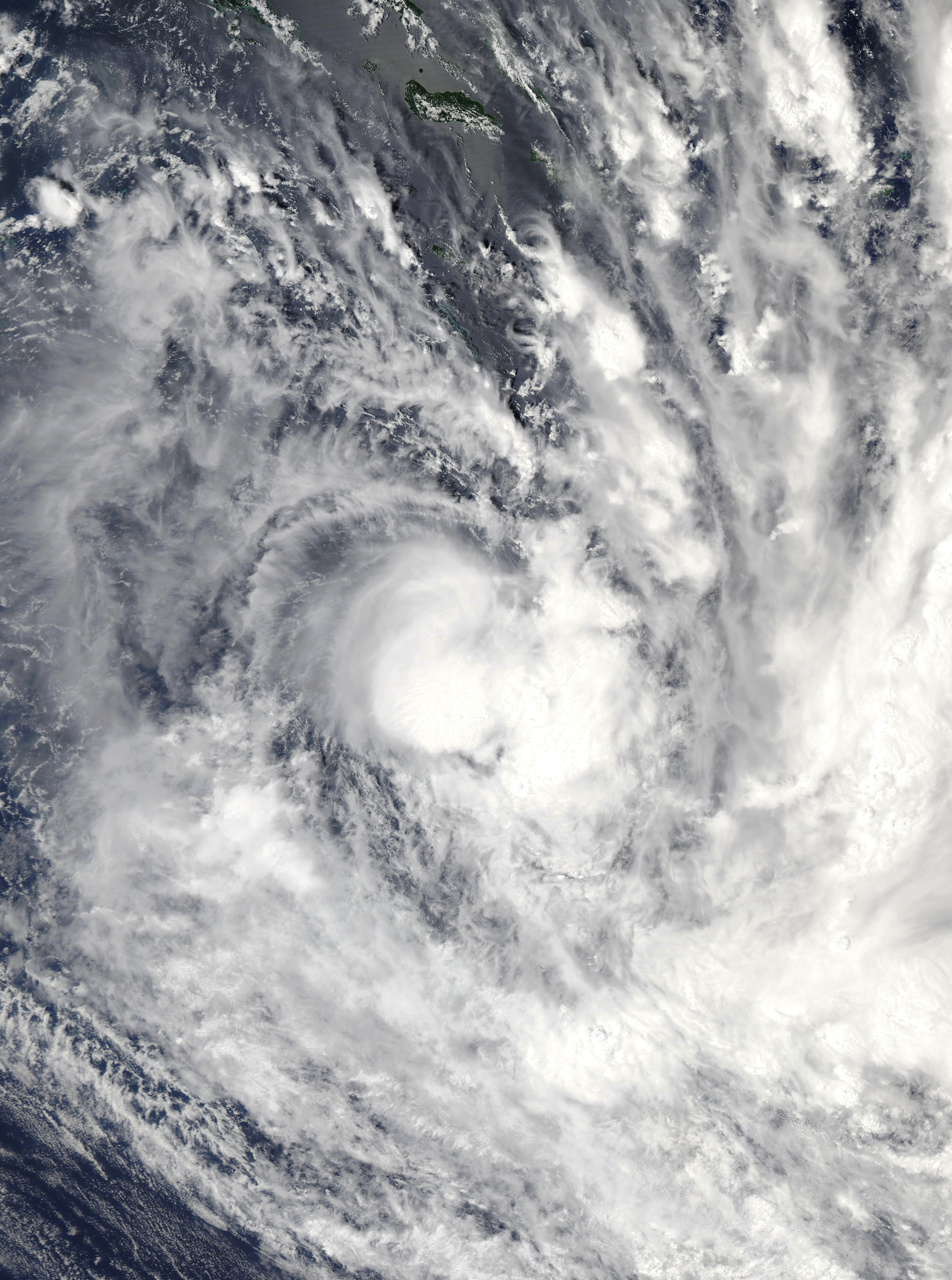
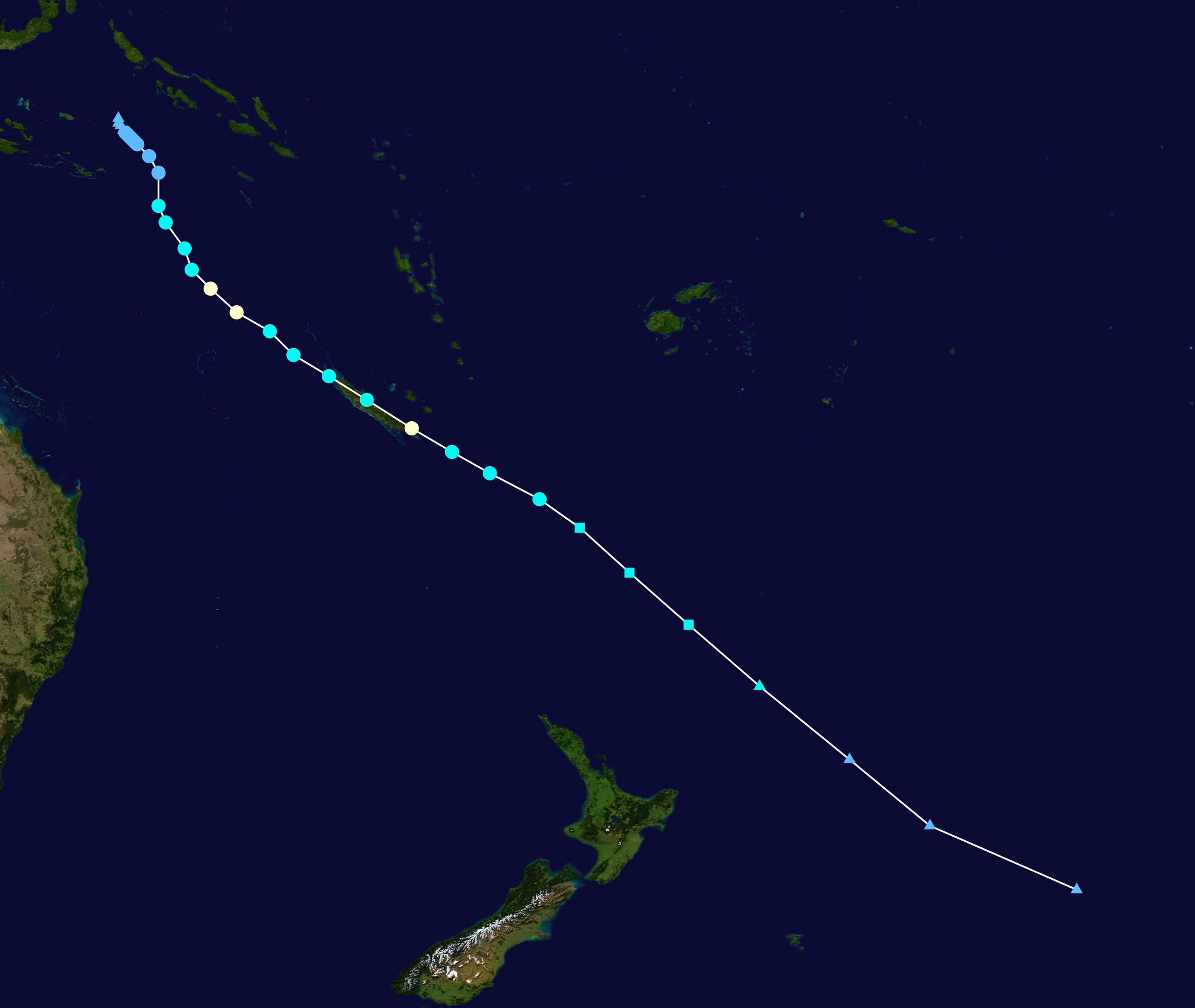
- Duration: December 13 (Entered basin) – December 15
- Peak intensity: 110 km/h (70 mph) (10-min); 975 hPa (mbar)

On December 13, Tropical Cyclone Ruby moved into the basin from the Australian region, as a Category 2 tropical cyclone on the Australian scale. Late on the same day, it made landfall on New Caledonia, and weakened as it emerged from the country. The FMS downgraded Ruby into a Category 1 tropical cyclone, and the JTWC issued their final advisory shortly thereafter. Ruby crossed into the MetService's area of responsibility, where it became an extratropical cyclone on December 15.

=== Tropical Disturbance 02F ===
- Tropical disturbance (Australian scale)
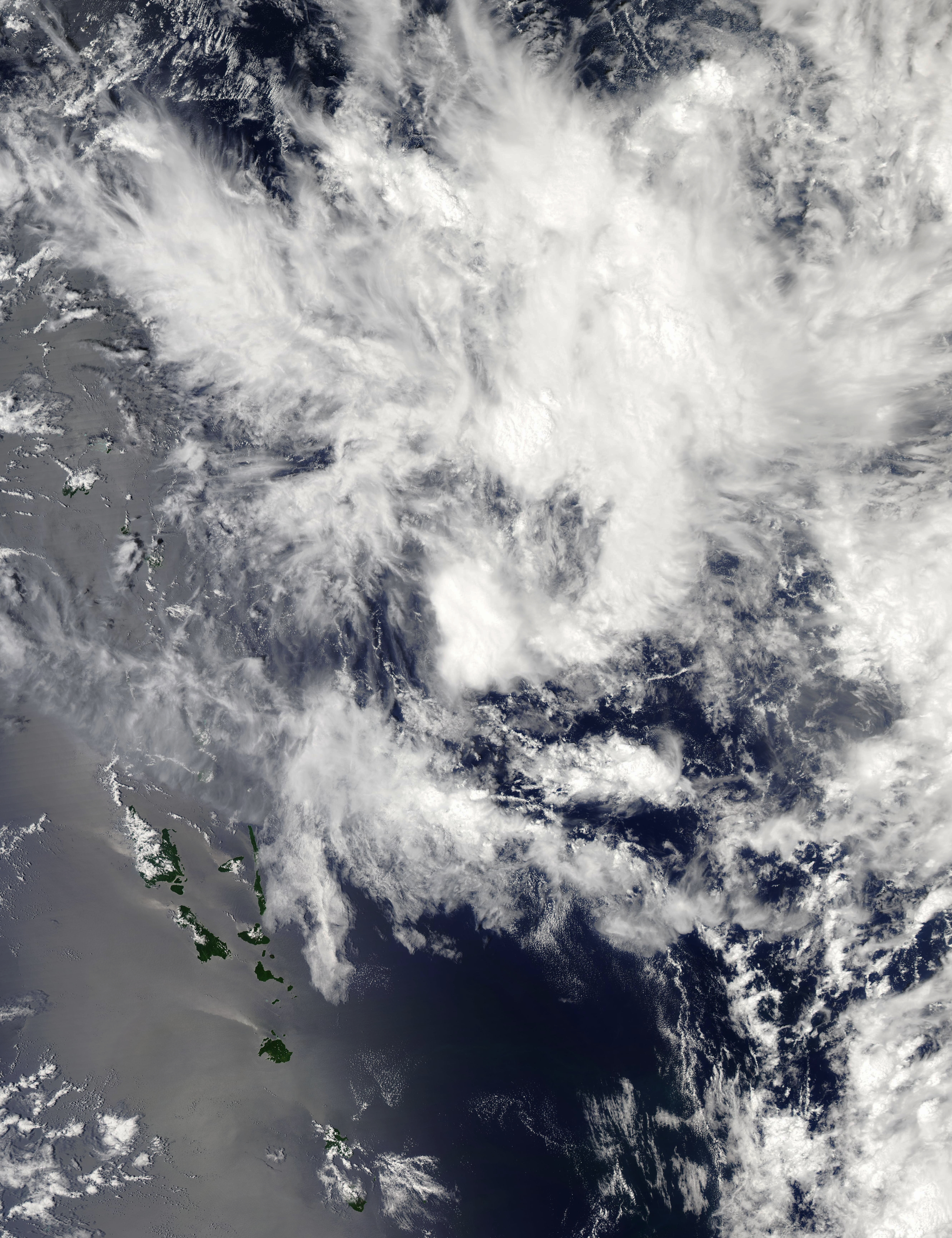
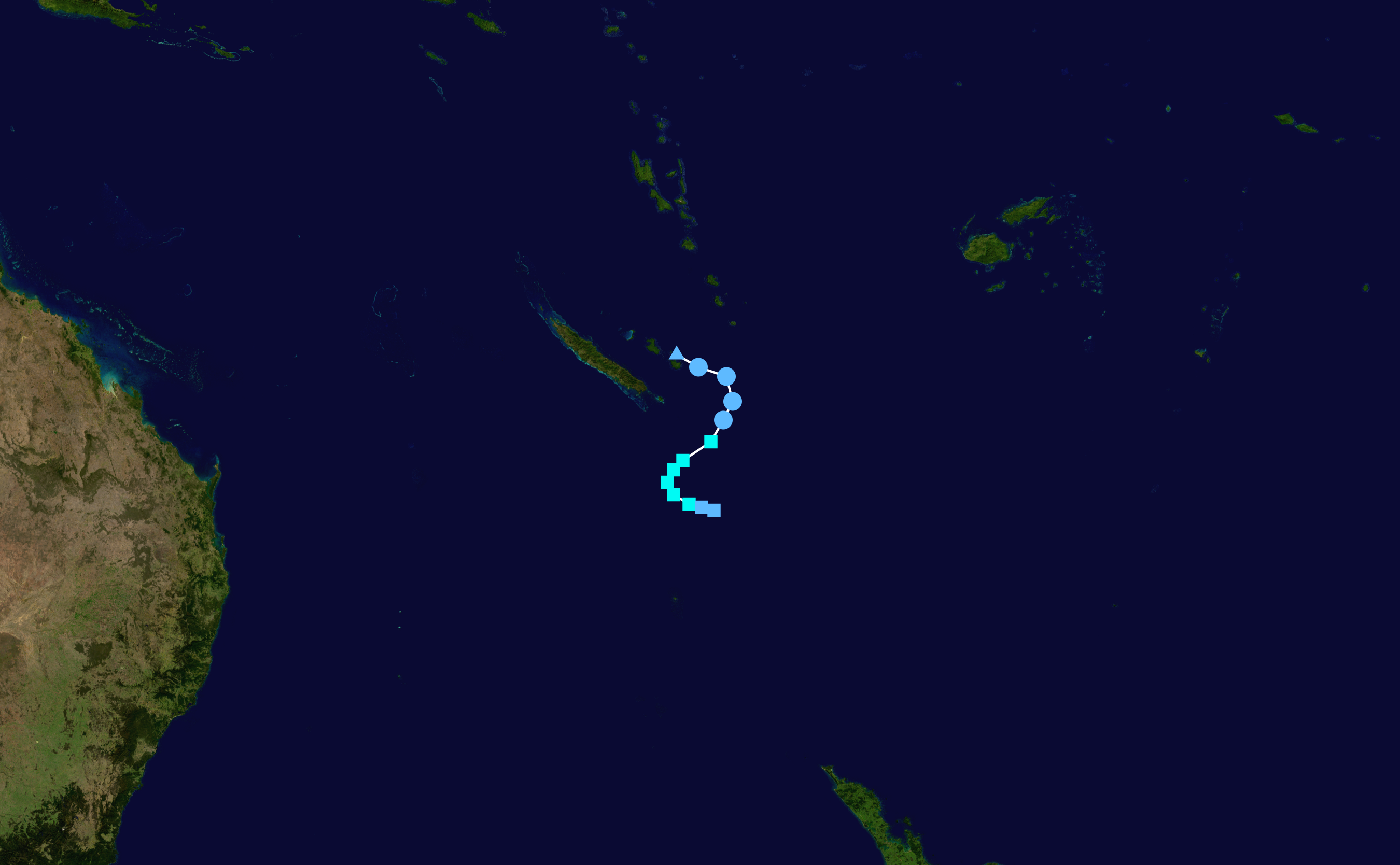
- Duration: December 17 – December 20
- Peak intensity: 55 km/h (35 mph) (10-min); 1004 hPa (mbar)

On December 17, the FMS reported that a tropical disturbance had developed in an area of low vertical wind shear, about 625 km (390 mi) to the northeast of Port Vila in Vanuatu. The FMS designated the tropical disturbance as 02F. Deep convection associated with the system persisted on a convergence line, away from the system's low-level circulation center. By December 20 the FMS issuing their final warning.

=== Severe Tropical Cyclone Cody ===
- Category 3 severe tropical cyclone (Australian scale)
- Tropical storm (SSHWS)
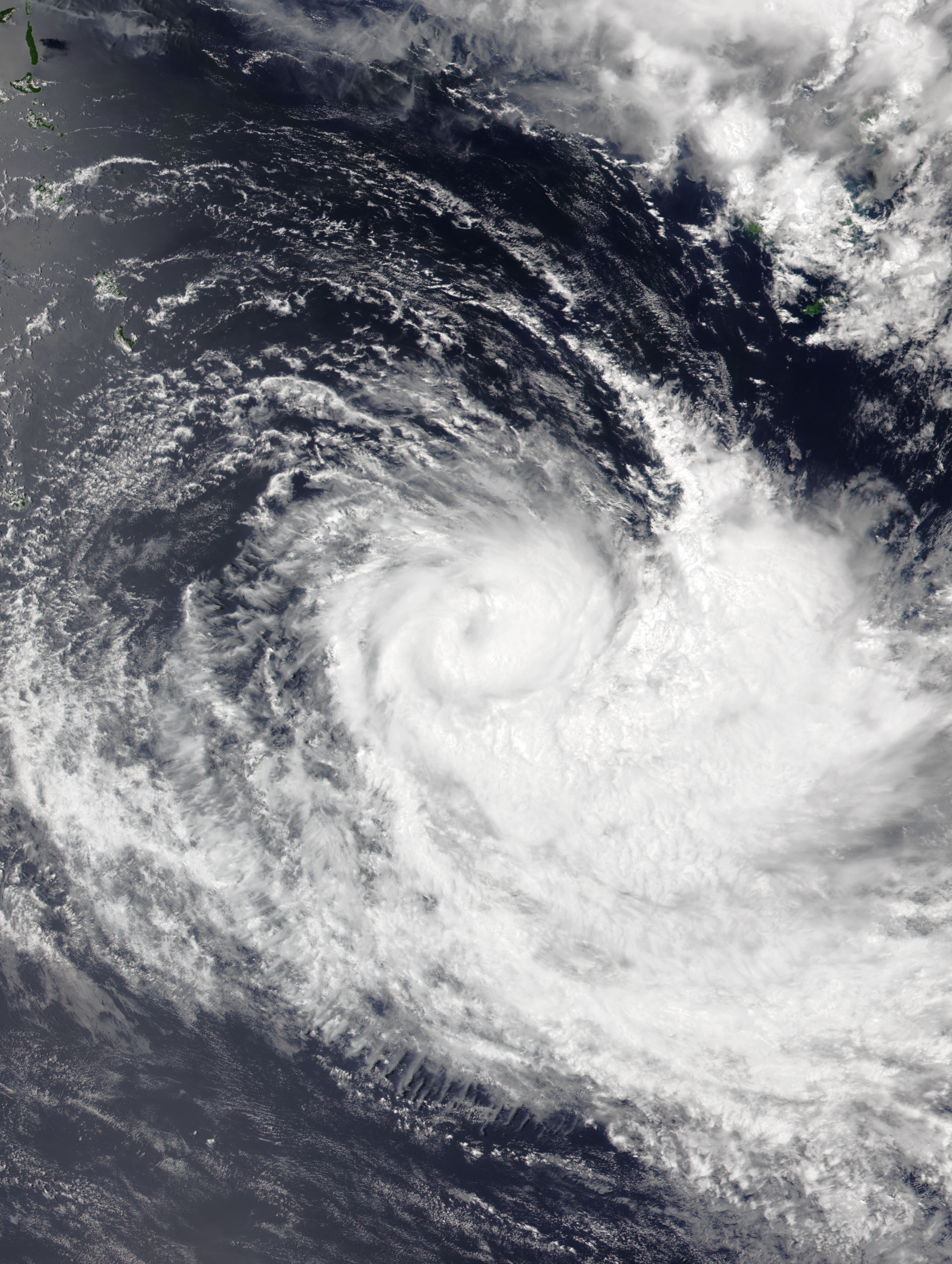
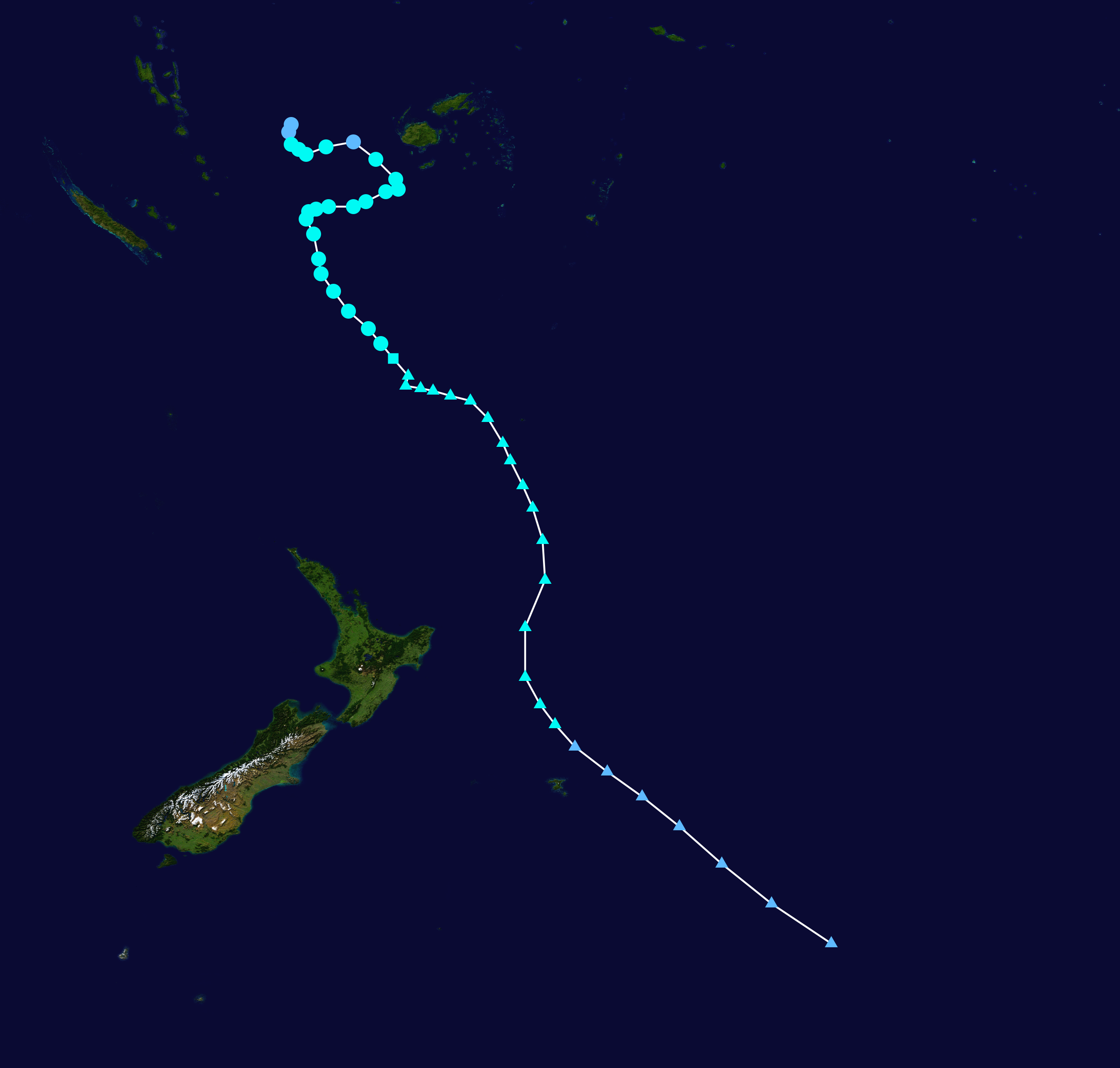
- Duration: January 5 – January 13
- Peak intensity: 130 km/h (80 mph) (10-min); 971 hPa (mbar)

On 5 January, the FMS began monitoring a tropical disturbance near Fiji, designating the system as 03F. Later that day, the Joint Typhoon Warning Center (JTWC) began monitoring 03F, though its development was inhibited due to wind shear. The system's chances of developing increased, and on 8 January, the JTWC issued a Tropical Cyclone Formation Alert for 03F. On the same day at 21:00 UTC, the JTWC upgraded 03F to a tropical depression, assigning it the designation 05P. 03F briefly weakened on the next day; however, it reorganized, with a satellite scatterometer pass showing winds of 35 knots (65 km/h; 40 mph) prompting the JTWC to upgrade it to a tropical storm. On 10 January, the FMS upgraded 03F to a Category 1 cyclone on the Australian scale and assigned it the name Cody. The FMS estimated peak 10-minute sustained winds of 130 km/h (80 mph), with the JTWC estimating peak 1-minute sustained winds of 95 km/h (60 mph). The JTWC assessed that Cody transitioned into a subtropical cyclone on 11 January, with the FMS issuing its last advisory for Cody late on 12 January.

Cody caused heavy rain in Fiji as a tropical depression, leading to flooding and infrastructure damage. 4,000 people had to be evacuated from their homes. On January 10, a man drowned in Fiji while attempting to cross a flooding river.

=== Tropical Depression 04F ===
- Tropical depression (Australian scale)
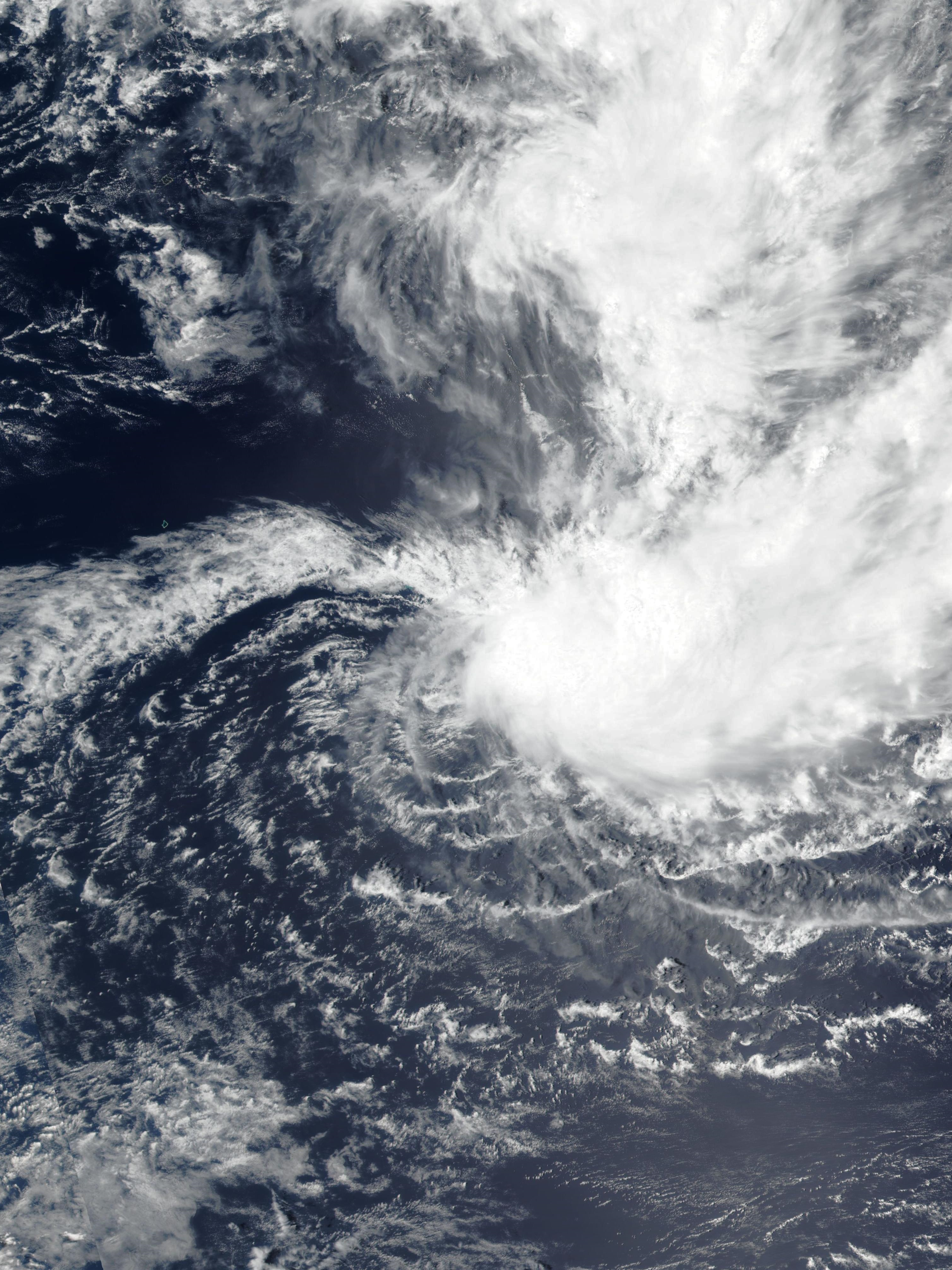
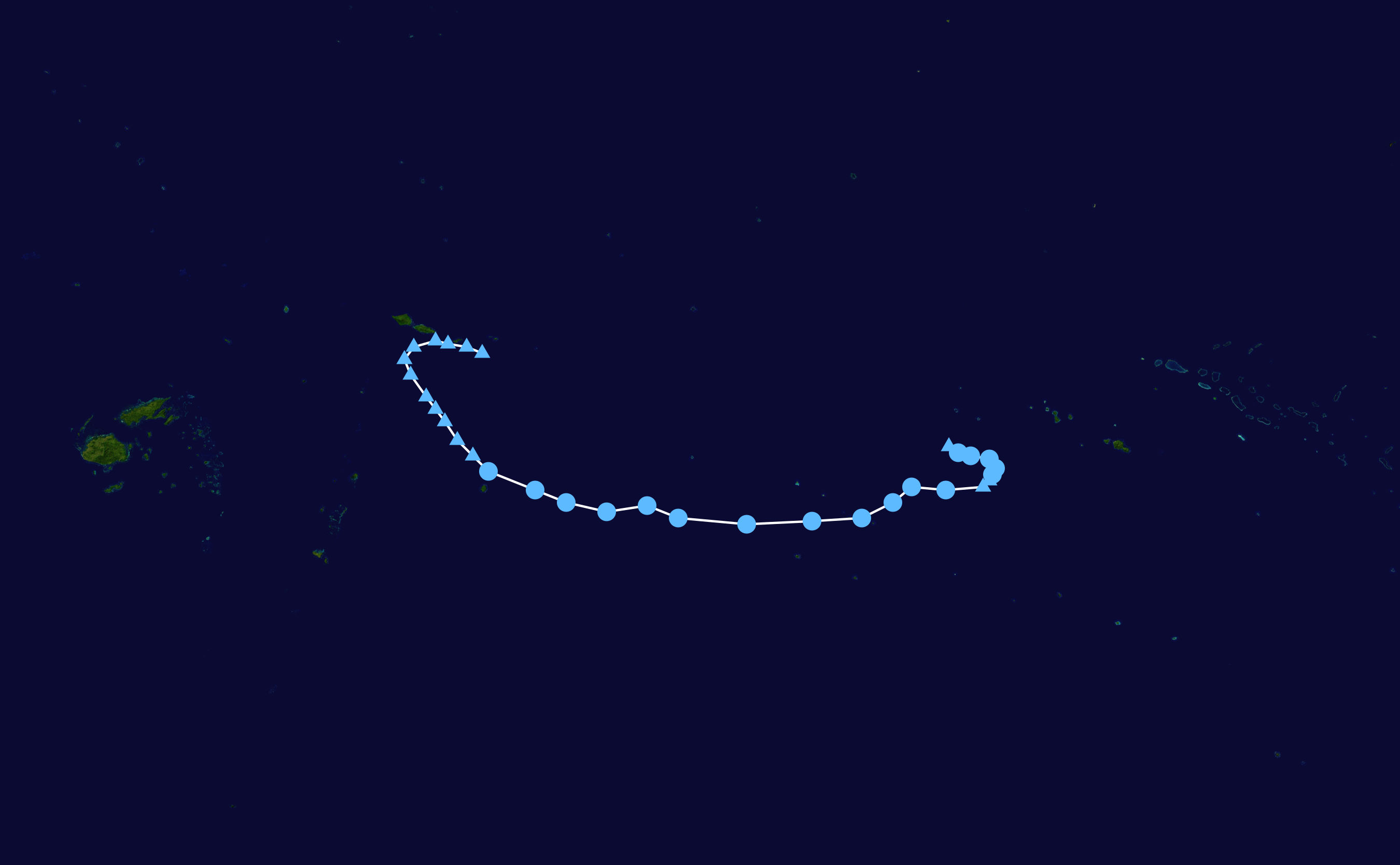
- Duration: January 15 – January 18
- Peak intensity: 55 km/h (35 mph) (10-min); 999 hPa (mbar)

Tropical Disturbance 04F formed on January 15, and its position was last noted on January 18 as a Tropical Depression.

=== Tropical Disturbance 05F ===
- Tropical disturbance (Australian scale)
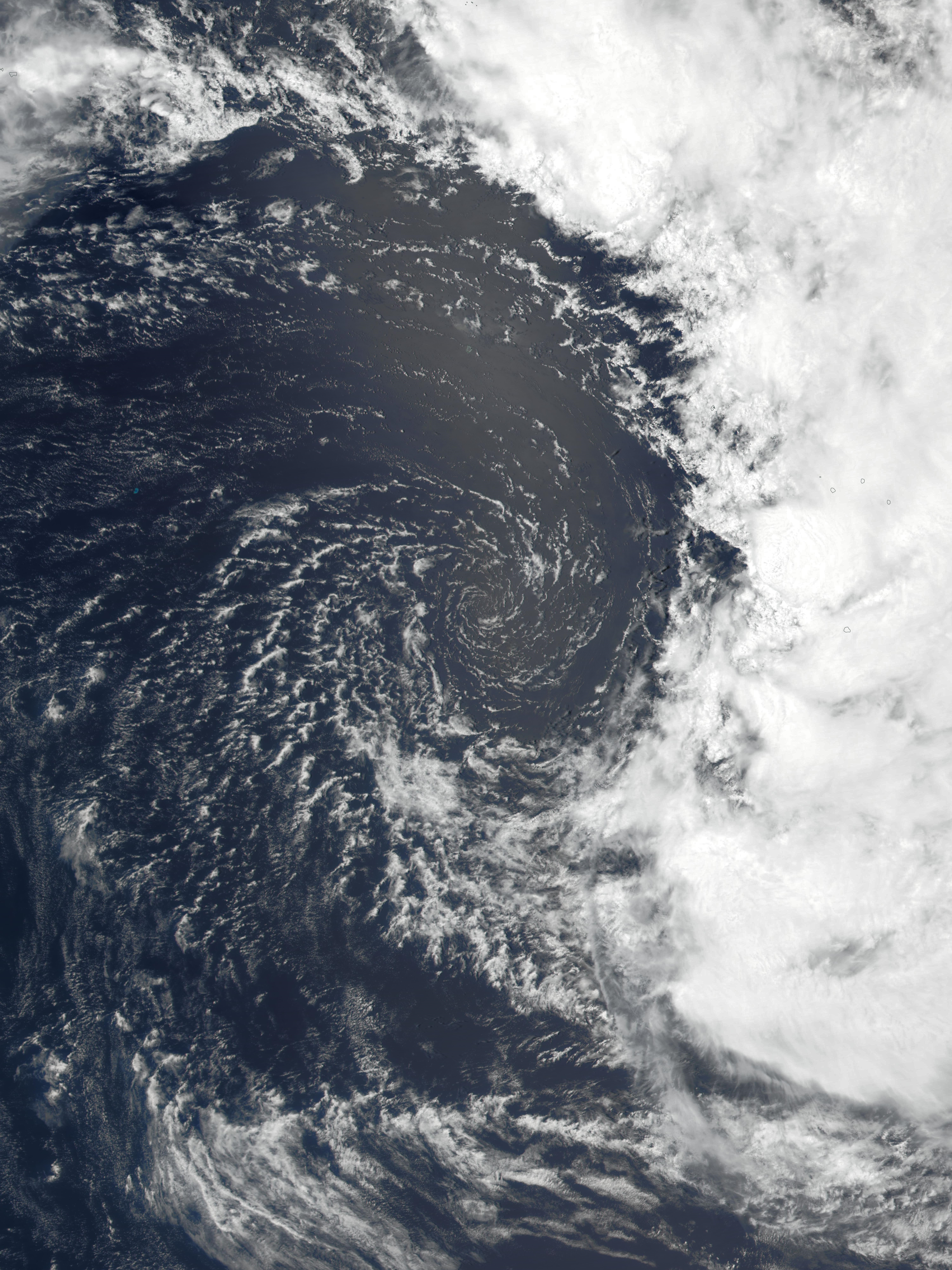
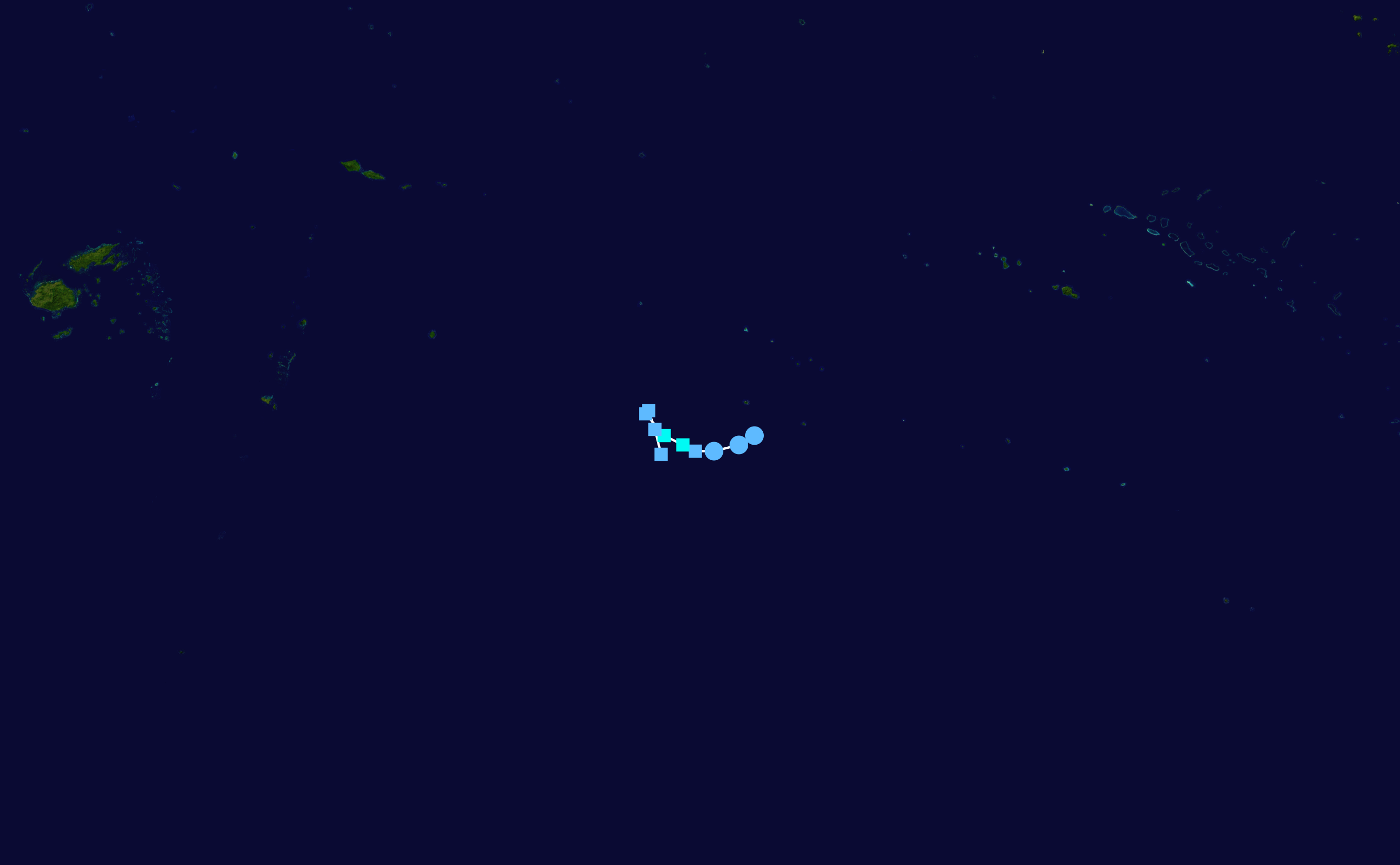
- Duration: January 19 – January 22
- Peak intensity: 55 km/h (35 mph) (10-min); 999 hPa (mbar)

Tropical Disturbance 05F formed on January 19 and dissipated on January 22. The JTWC reclassified it as a subtropical cyclone.

=== Tropical Disturbance 06F ===
- Tropical disturbance (Australian scale)
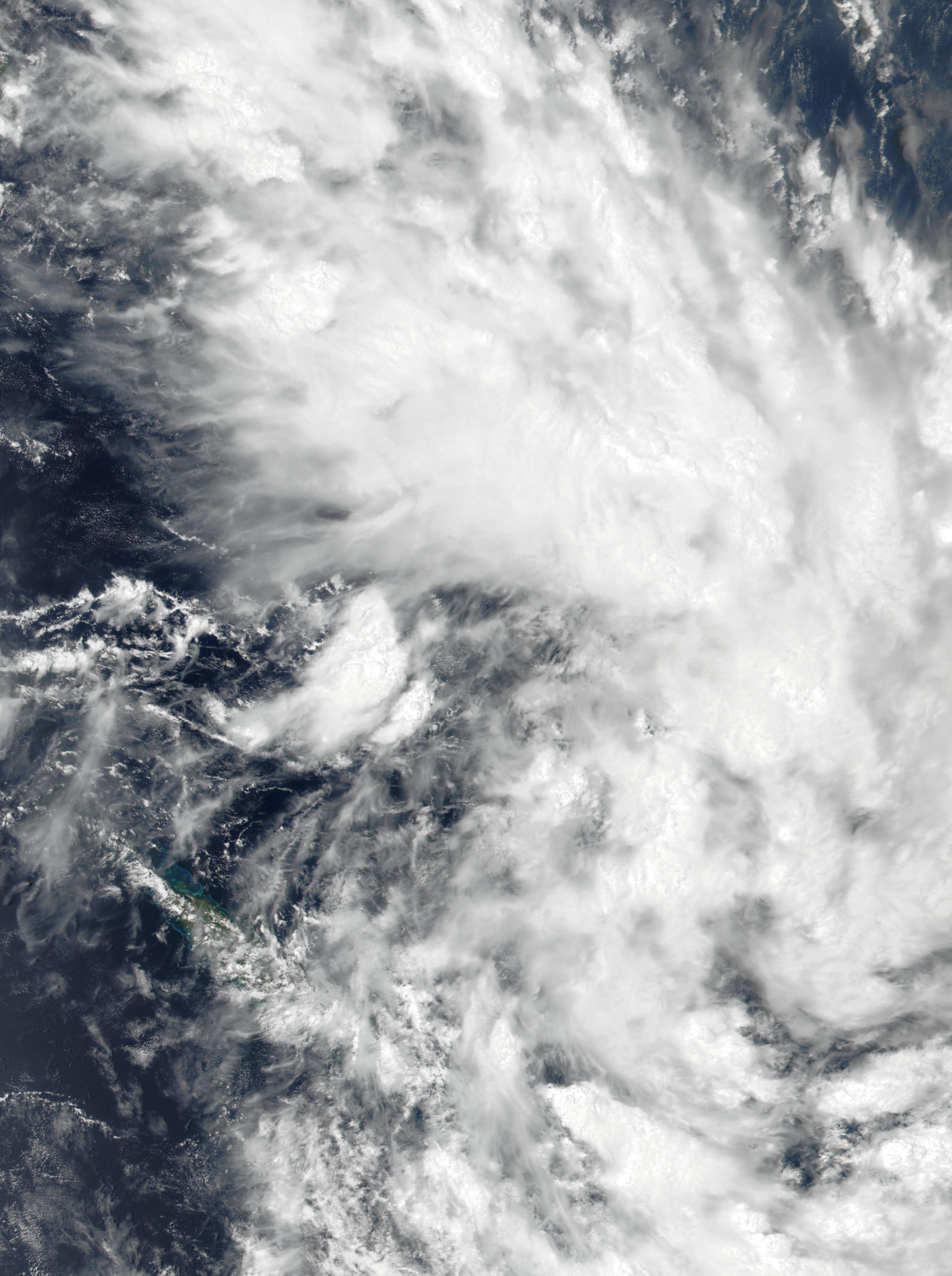
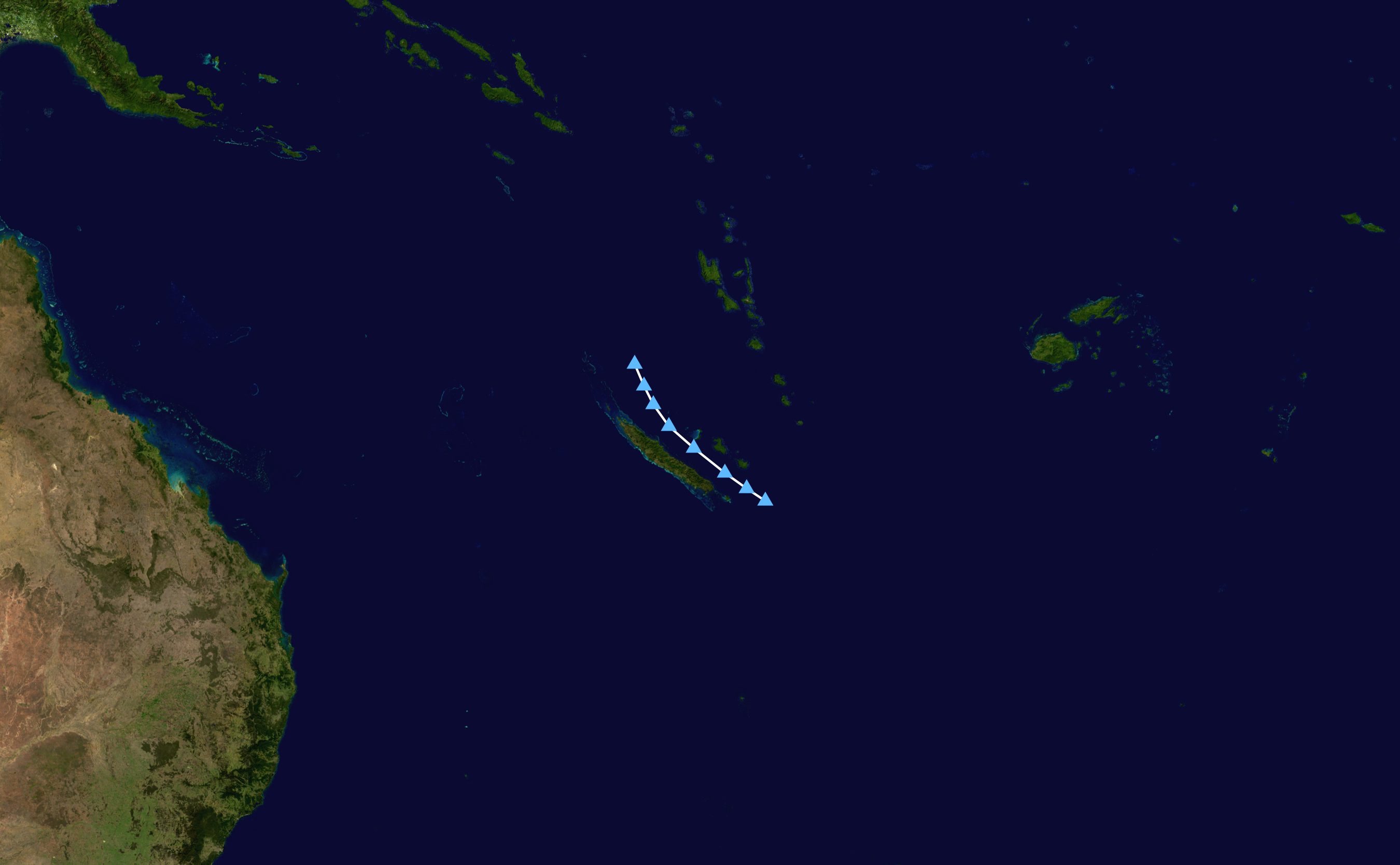
- Duration: January 28 – January 30
- Peak intensity: 55 km/h (35 mph) (10-min); 1001 hPa (mbar)

During January 28, the FMS started to monitor a tropical disturbance, which had developed about 185 km (115 mi) to the west of Port Villa in Vanuatu. It was designated as 06F. 06F was last noted on January 30.

=== Tropical Disturbance 07F ===
- Tropical disturbance (Australian scale)
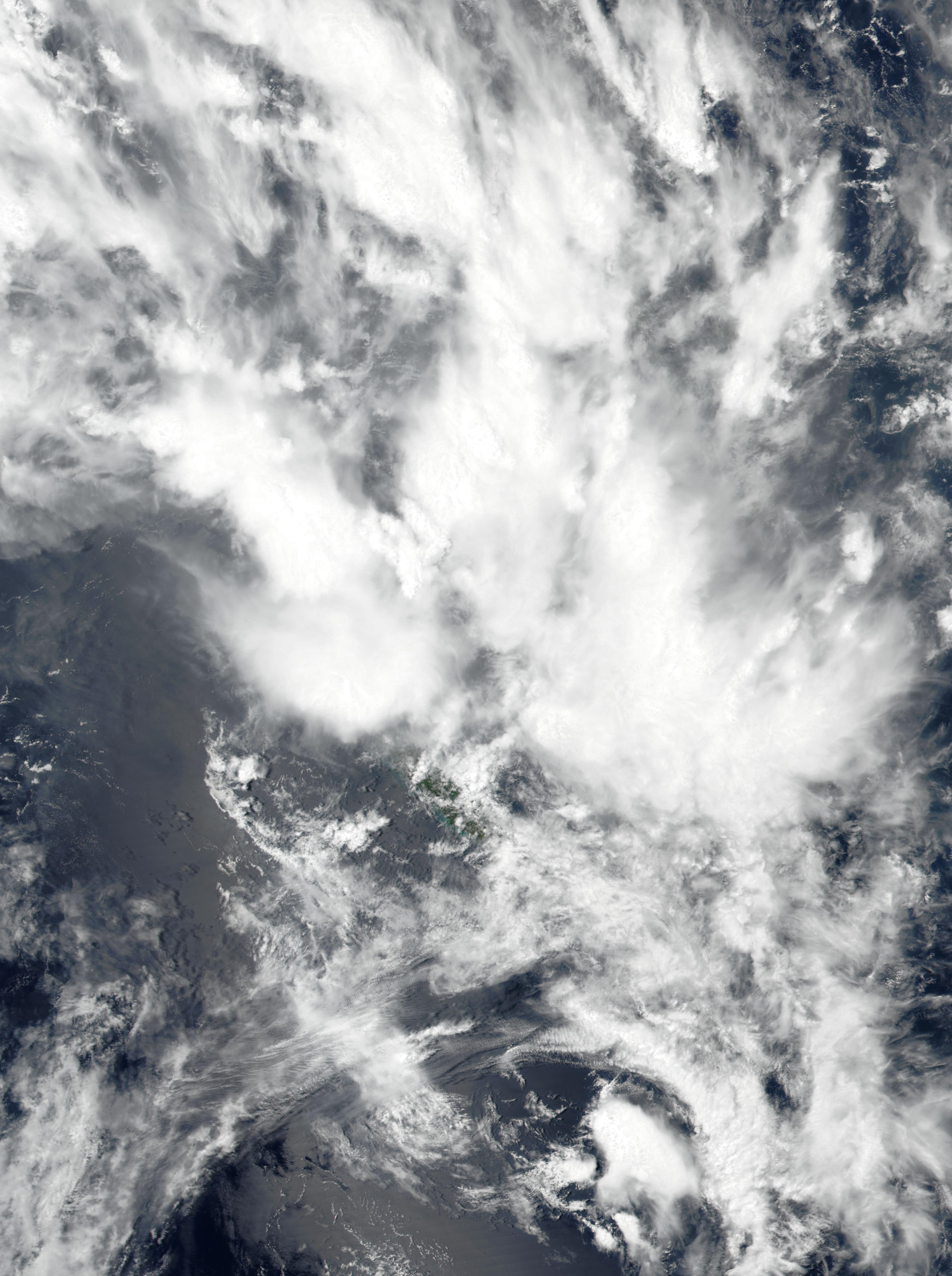
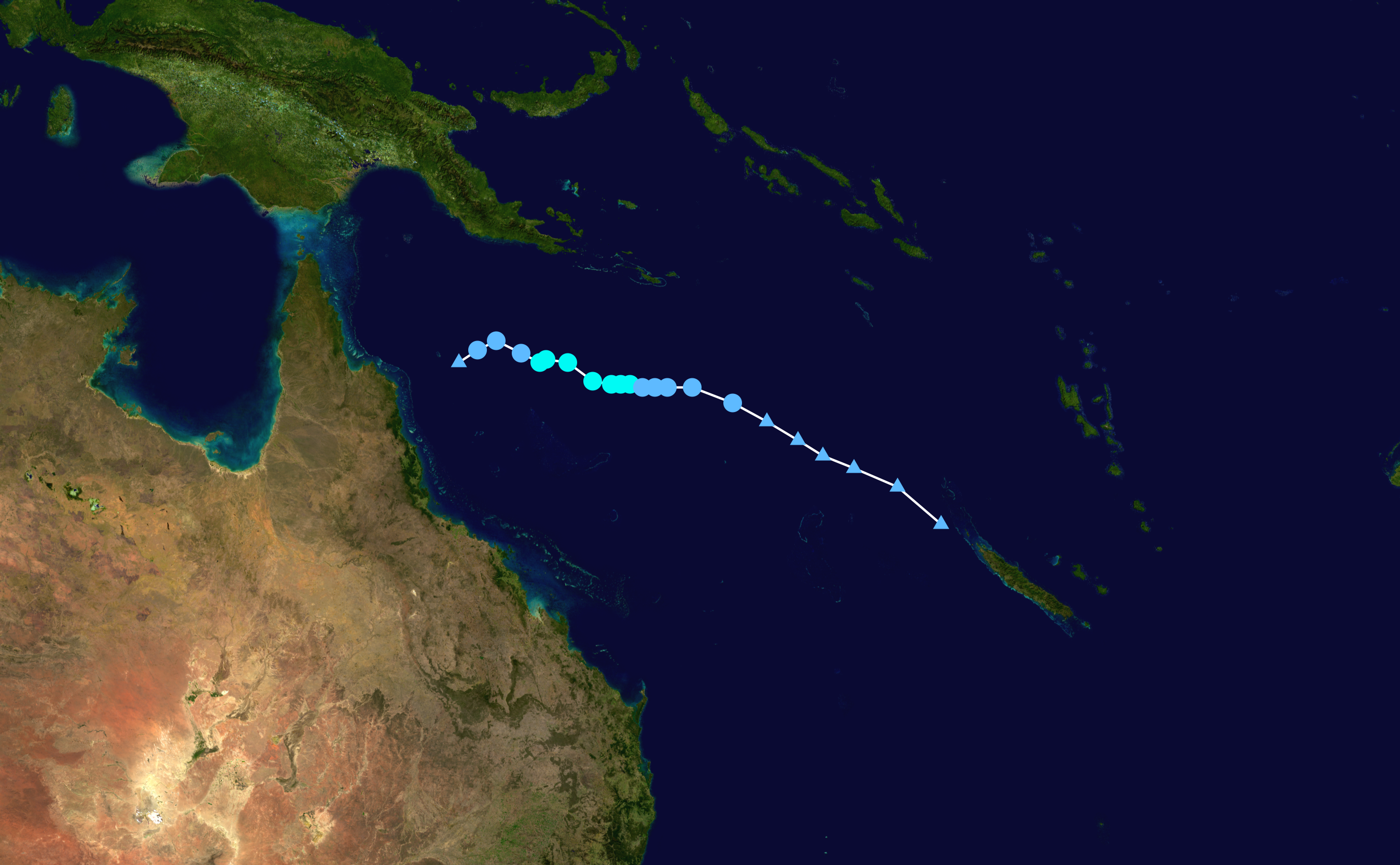
- Duration: February 3 (Entered basin) – February 7
- Peak intensity: 55 km/h (35 mph) (10-min); 998 hPa (mbar)

On February 3, Tropical Low 16U entered the basin and was reclassified as Tropical Disturbance 07F by the FMS. 07F was last noted on February 7, near New Caledonia.

=== Severe Tropical Cyclone Dovi ===
- Category 4 severe tropical cyclone (Australian scale)
- Category 2 tropical cyclone (SSHWS)
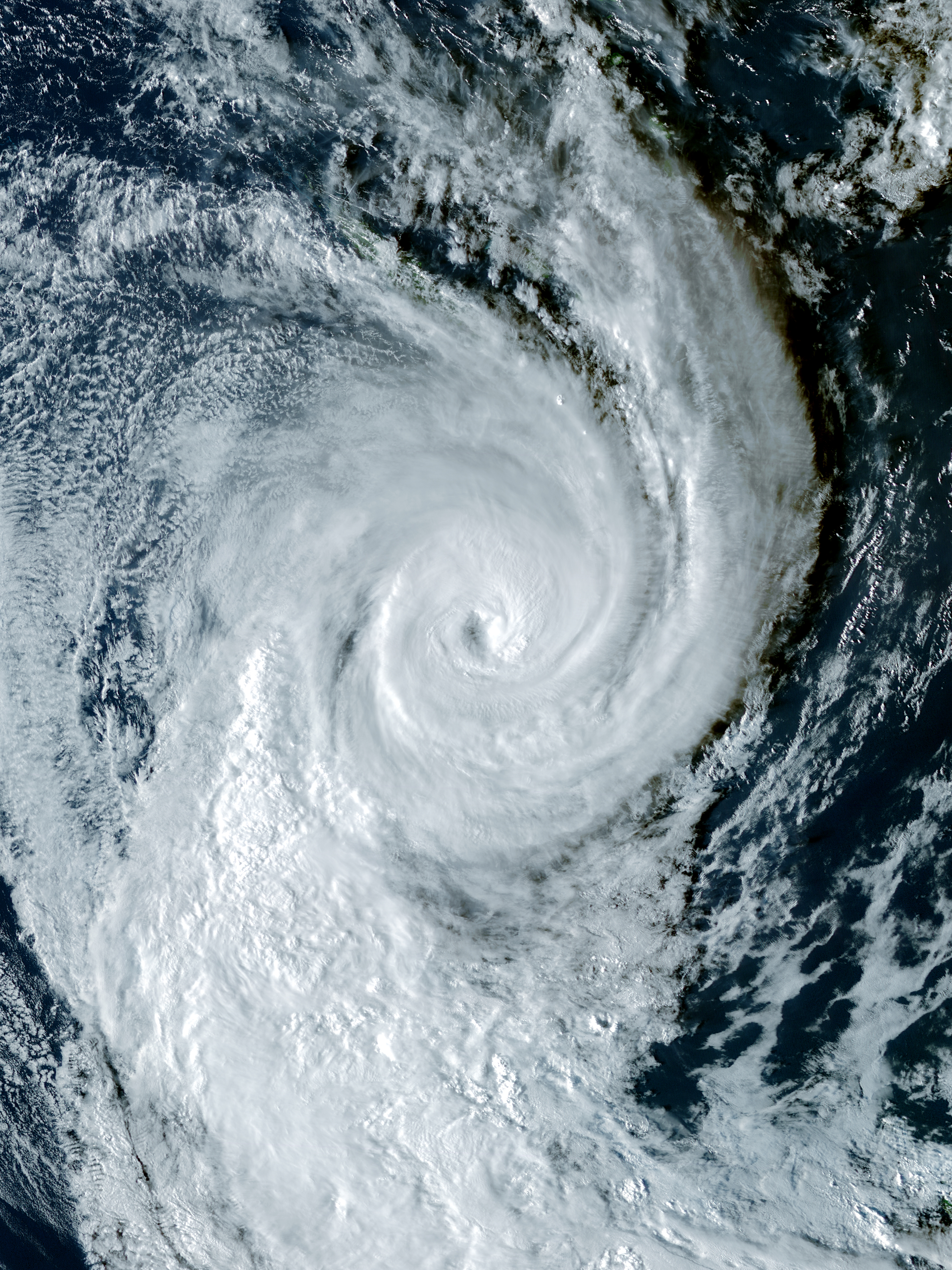
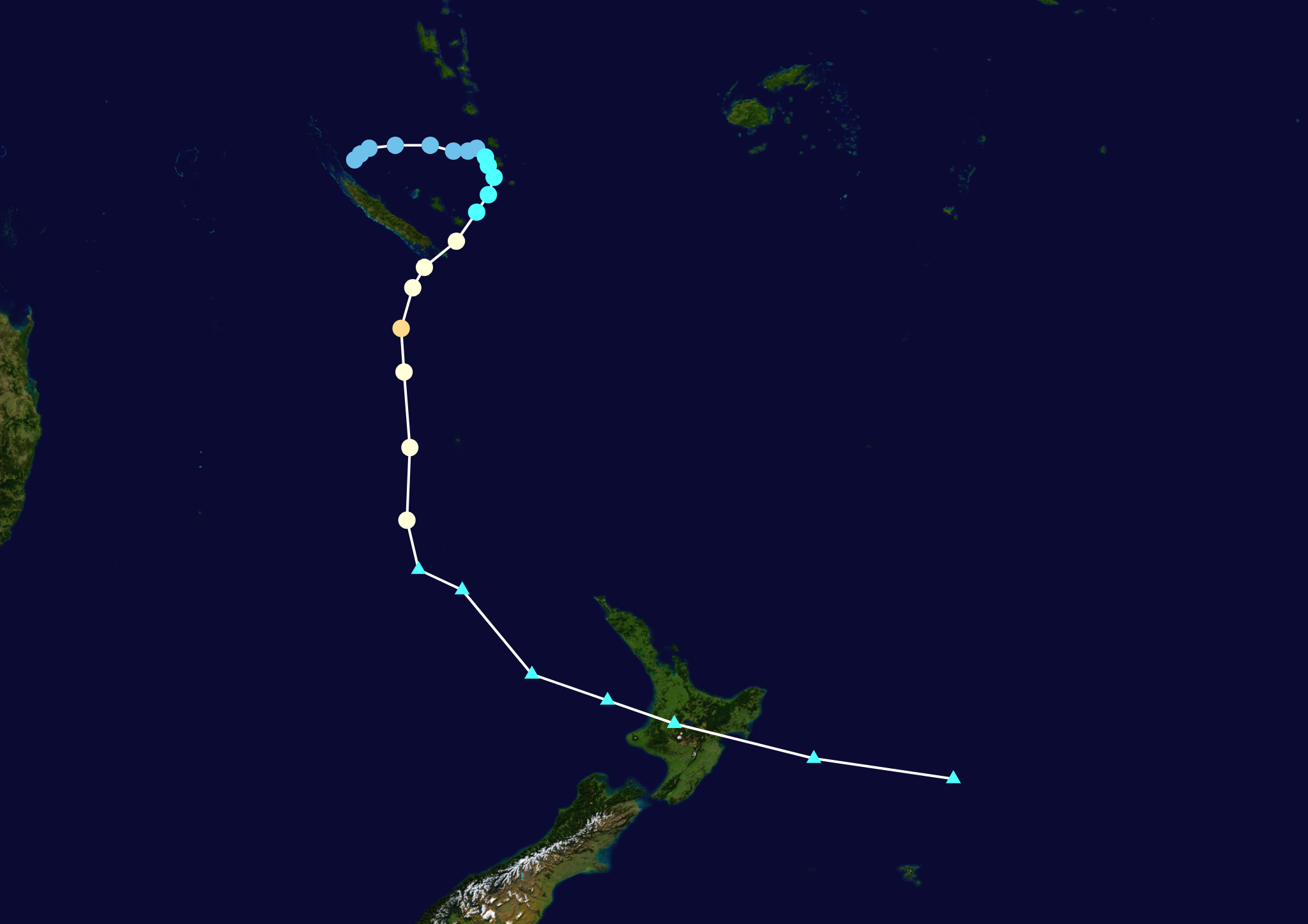
- Duration: February 6 – February 12
- Peak intensity: 175 km/h (110 mph) (10-min); 940 hPa (mbar)

On February 4, the United States Joint Typhoon Warning Center reported that a tropical disturbance had developed within the Australian region about 1,285 km (800 mi) to the west of New Caledonia. The disturbance was starting to develop a low-level circulation, which was accompanied by fragmented atmospheric convection, along a frontal boundary that extended across the Cape York Peninsula and the Coral Sea. Over the next couple of days, the Australian Bureau of Meteorology (BoM) and the Fiji Meteorological Service (FMS) started to monitor the poorly organized system as Tropical Low 18U and Tropical Disturbance 08F, as it moved eastwards within the frontal boundary towards Vanuatu and the South Pacific basin. During February 7, the system started to slowly consolidate, as it passed to the north of New Caledonia, before the FMS classified the system as a tropical depression. At this stage, the depression was moving eastwards and was predicted to continue to move eastwards towards Fiji, however, the depression slowed down as it approached the islands of southern Vanuatu during February 8.

Government buildings were closed around lunchtime on 9 February, as residents packed grocery stores for supplies. As Cyclone Dovi moved through Vanuatu, heavy rainfall was observed which resulted in major flash flooding. Over 400 people nationwide had to flee to shelters due to the cyclone. Schools across northern and southern New Caledonia, and the Loyalty Islands all businesses, public buildings, and schools were closed. Multiple evacuation centres were opened across the Loyalty Islands. The MetService of New Zealand declared the extratropical remnants of Dovi a "significant weather event". The NZ Transport Agency warned of the closure of the Auckland Harbour Bridge, which was closed on the morning of 13 February. More than 100 Air New Zealand flights were cancelled due to the storm.

=== Tropical Cyclone Eva ===
- Category 1 tropical cyclone (Australian scale)
- Tropical storm (SSHWS)
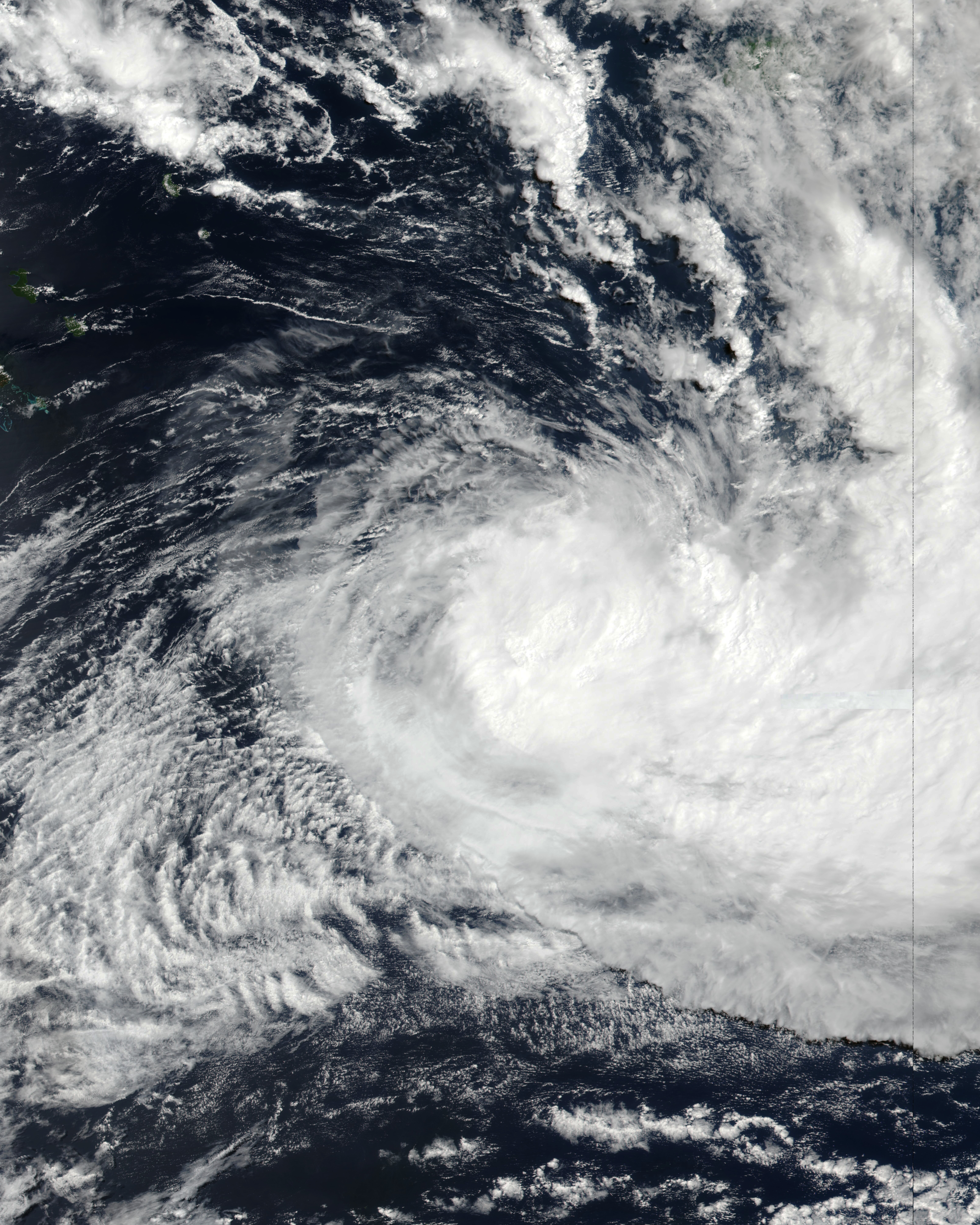
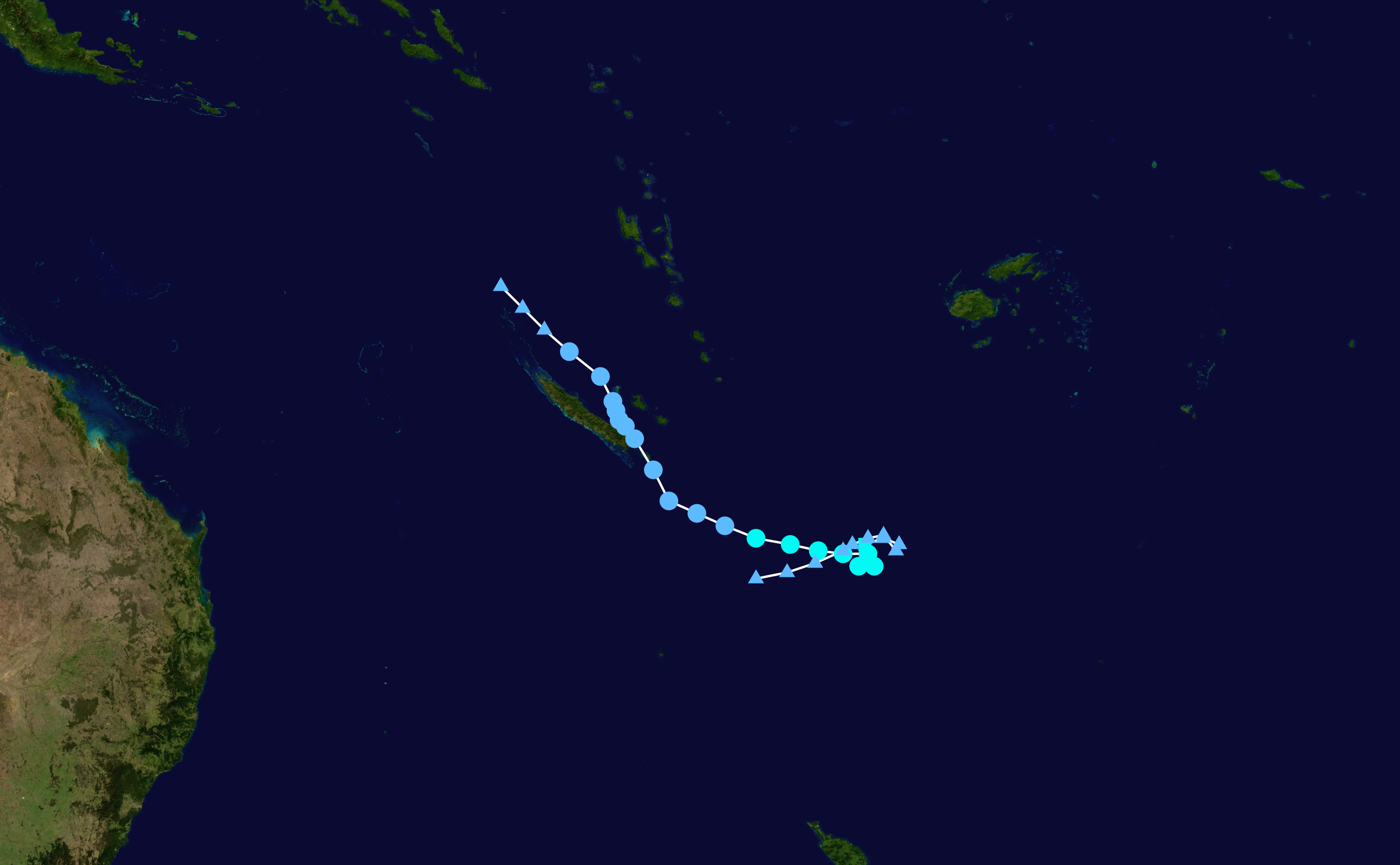
- Duration: February 26 – March 5
- Peak intensity: 65 km/h (40 mph) (10-min); 995 hPa (mbar)

On February 26, a tropical disturbance formed and was designated as 09F by the FMS; it intensified to a tropical depression on the next day. On March 3, The JTWC upgraded the system into a tropical cyclone and identified it as 18P. The tropical depression intensified into a Category 1 tropical cyclone and was named Eva. The peak was short-lived, as Eva moved to the southeast and the JTWC reclassified Eva as a subtropical cyclone. Eva dissipated on March 5.

=== Tropical Cyclone Fili ===
- Category 2 tropical cyclone (Australian scale)
- Tropical storm (SSHWS)
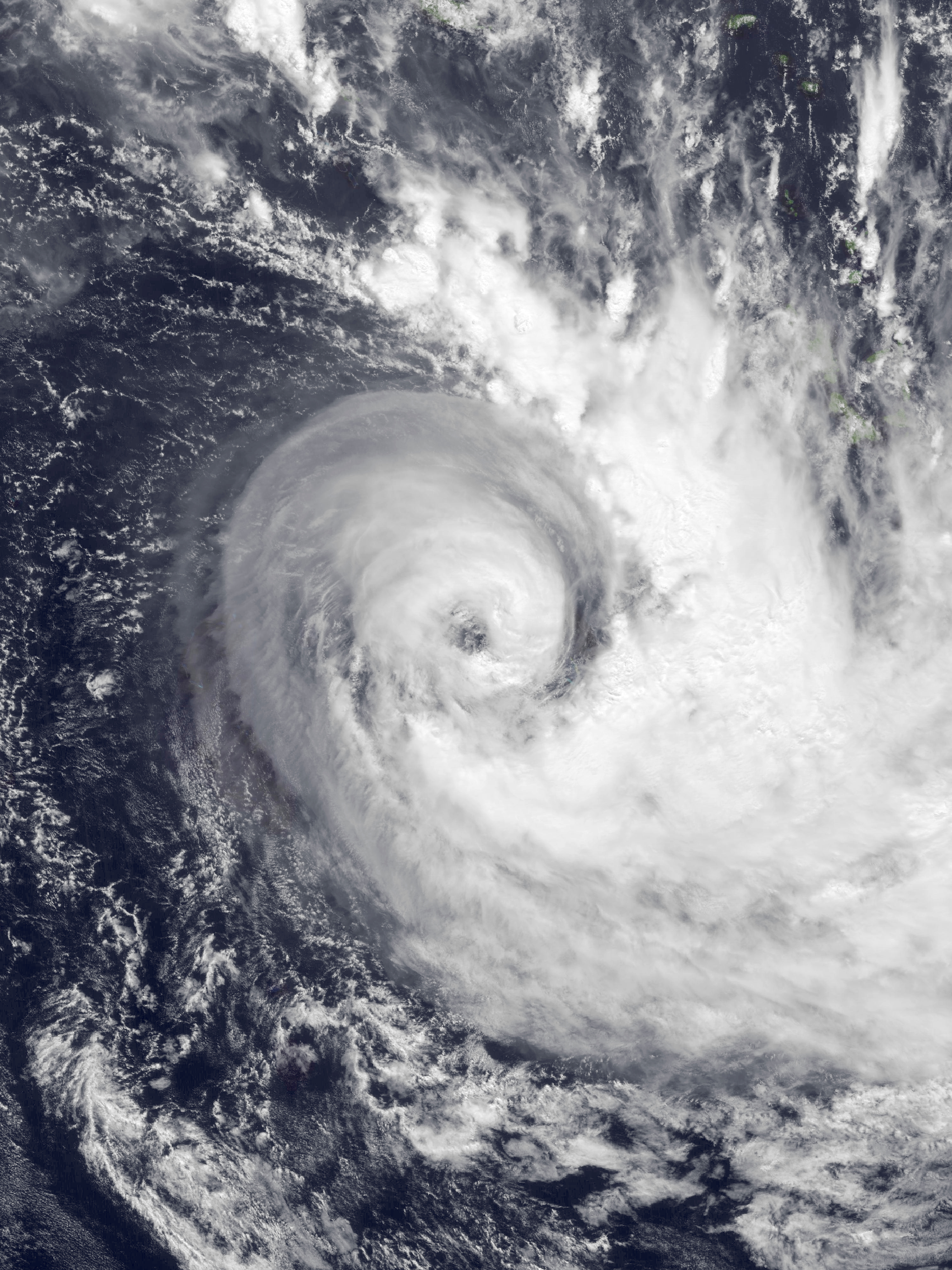
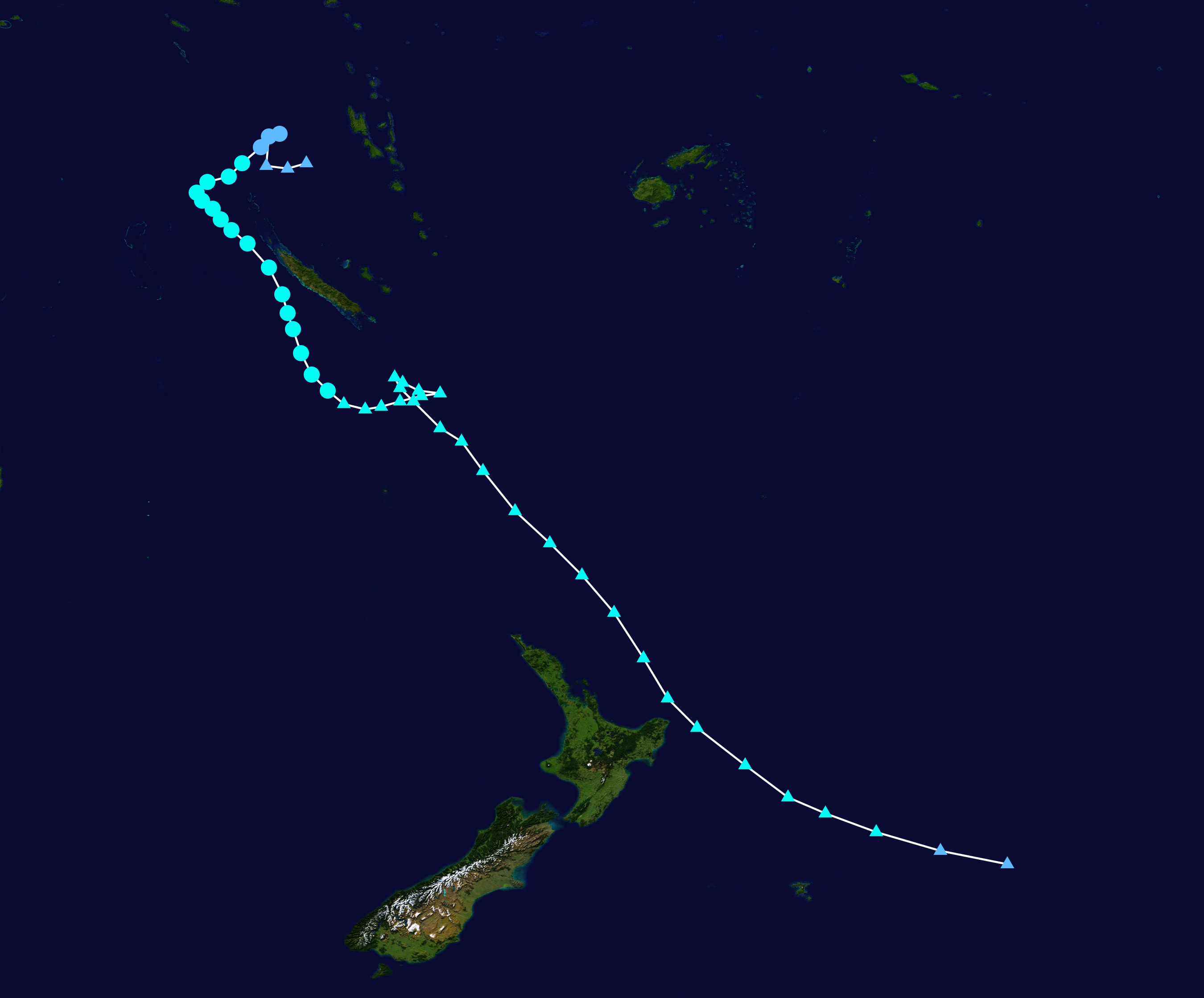
- Duration: April 3 – April 9
- Peak intensity: 110 km/h (70 mph) (10-min); 977 hPa (mbar)

During April 3, the FMS and the BoM started to monitor Tropical Disturbance 10F/31U, which had developed about 410 km (255 mi) to the northwest of Port Vila in Vanuatu. The next day, in an unofficial bulletin, the JTWC classified the system as a "tropical cyclone", when it reached 35 knots on the Saffir-Simpson scale. The FMS did the same and was named Fili. The eye formed at its center, and the FMS upgraded the system to Category 2 cyclone with 10-min winds at 70 mph and a pressure of 977 mbar. Fili started to weaken as it moved to an area of subtropical confection and the JTWC reclassified Fili as a subtropical storm. Fili dissipated on April 9.

MetService issued red heavy rain warnings in Gisborne and Wairoa as the cyclone approached the country. Fili brought heavy rain and wind to areas around East Cape on April 12 and 13, leading to flooding, downed trees, power outages, and closed roads.

=== Tropical Cyclone Gina ===
- Category 1 tropical cyclone (Australian scale)
- Tropical storm (SSHWS)
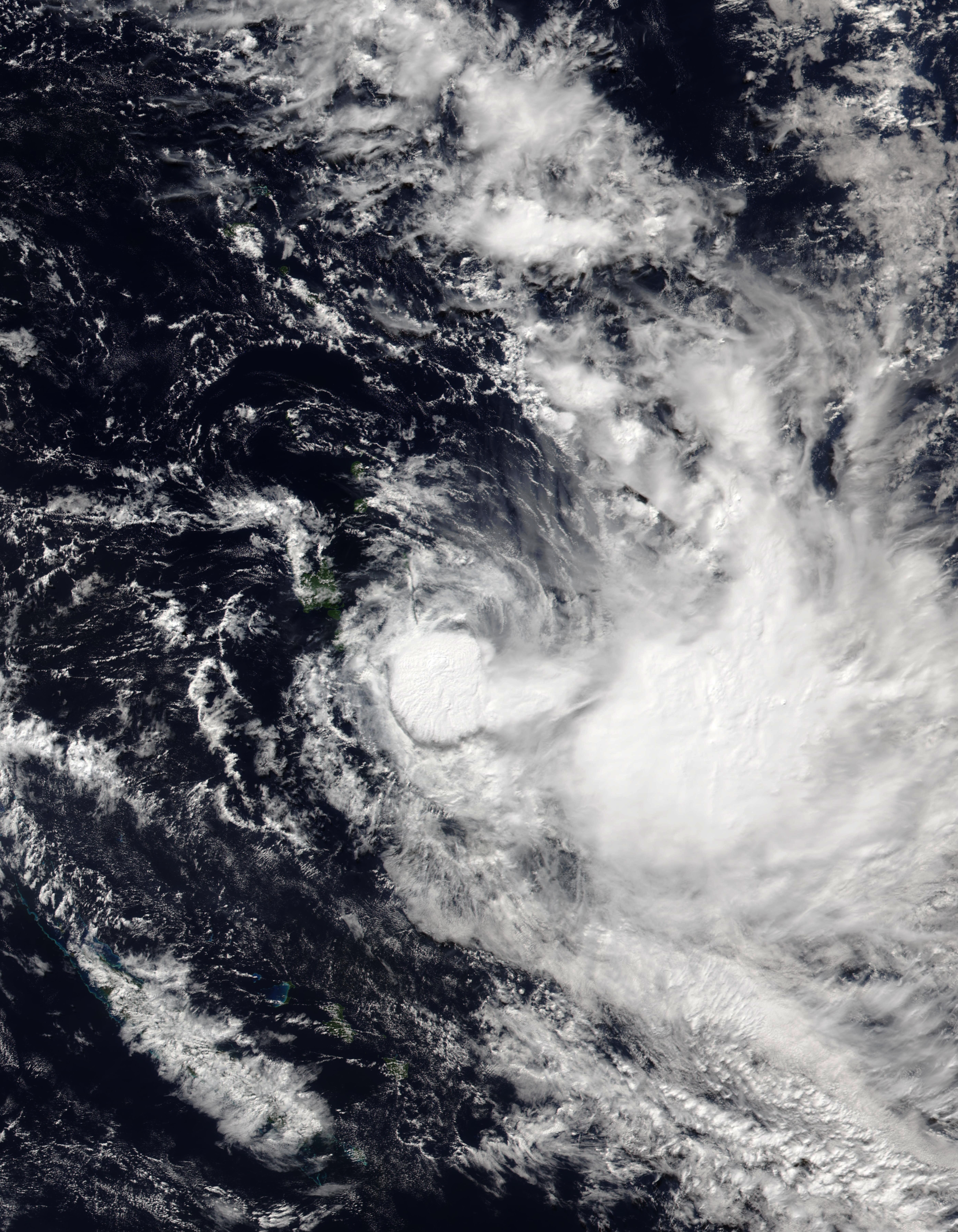
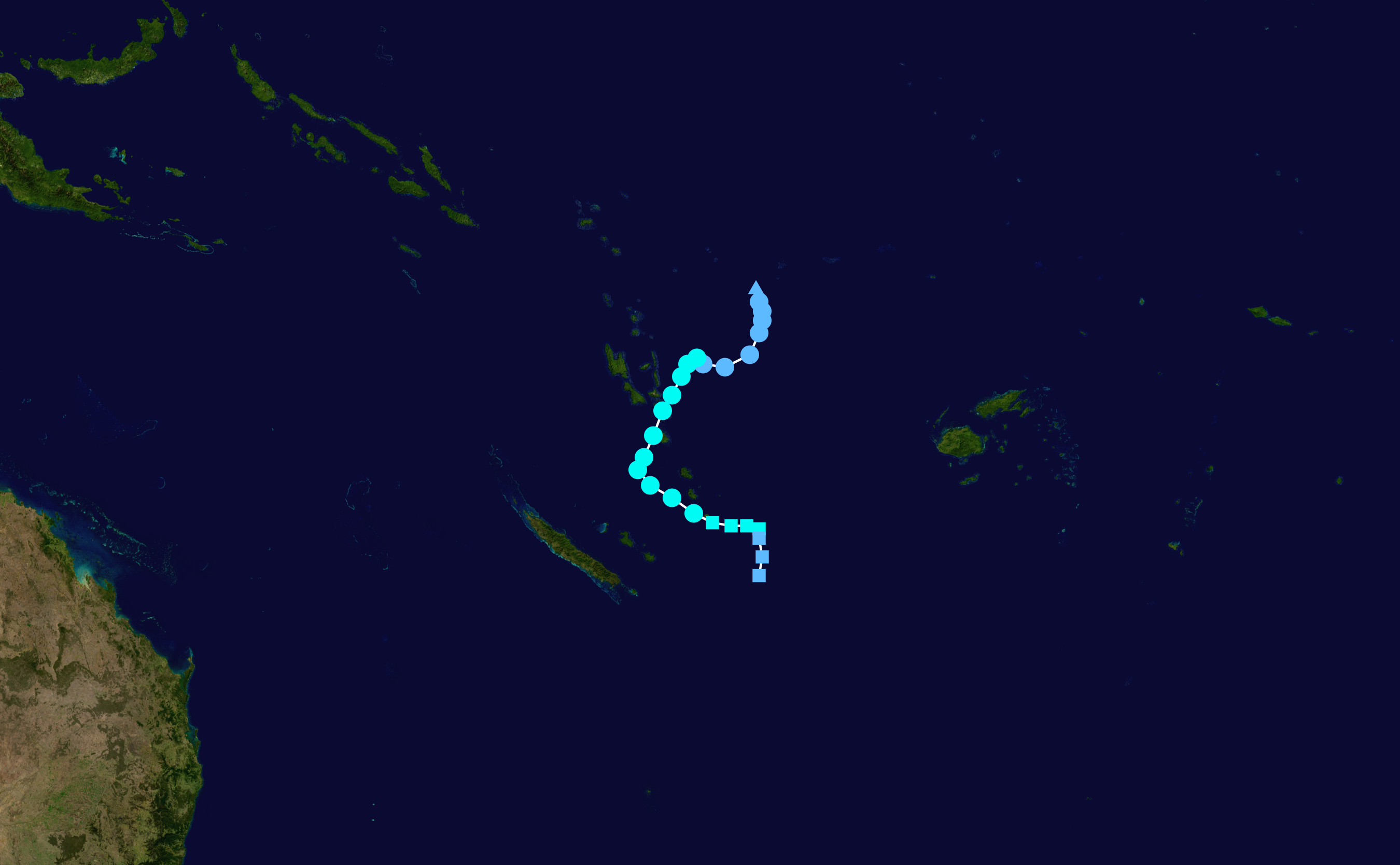
- Duration: May 16 – May 21
- Peak intensity: 75 km/h (45 mph) (10-min); 998 hPa (mbar)

During May 16, the FMS reported that Tropical Disturbance 11F had developed, about 600 km (375 mi) to the northeast of Port Vila, Vanuatu. At this time, the system had a broad low-level circulation centre, which had light winds of 5–10 mph (10–20 km/h) associated with it. Over the next day, atmospheric convection consolidated over the low level circulation center, within a favourable environment for further development with robust outflow, low-moderate vertical windshear and warm sea-surface temperatures of around 29–30 °C (84–86 °F). As a result, the JTWC issued a tropical cyclone formation alert (TCFA) on the disturbance and warned that there was a high potential for the disturbance to develop into a tropical cyclone, as it moved south-westwards towards Vanuatu. The FMS subsequently reported that the disturbance had developed into a tropical depression, while it was located about 435 km (270 mi) to the northeast of Port Vila. The JTWC subsequently cancelled the TCFA during May 18, after the depression had veered westwards from its south-westwards track, into an area of high vertical wind shear, while its low level circulation became fully exposed and decoupled from its central deep overcast.

Later that day, the JTWC initiated advisories on the depression and designated it as Tropical Cyclone 26P, after a fresh area of atmospheric convection had started to grow and expand over the low-level circulation. The FMS subsequently reported that the depression had developed into a category 1 tropical cyclone and named it Gina, after winds of 45 mph (75 km/h) had been observed near the systems centre. The newly named system subsequently struggled to overcome the effects of the vertical windshear and maintain deep persistent atmospheric convection, as it moved south-westwards along the subtropical ridge of high pressure. Gina dissipated on May 21.

Heavy rain associated with Gina caused flooding to be reported in various parts of Vanuatu, including at Port Vila's Bauerfield Airport which caused both domestic and international flights to be cancelled.

=== Other system ===
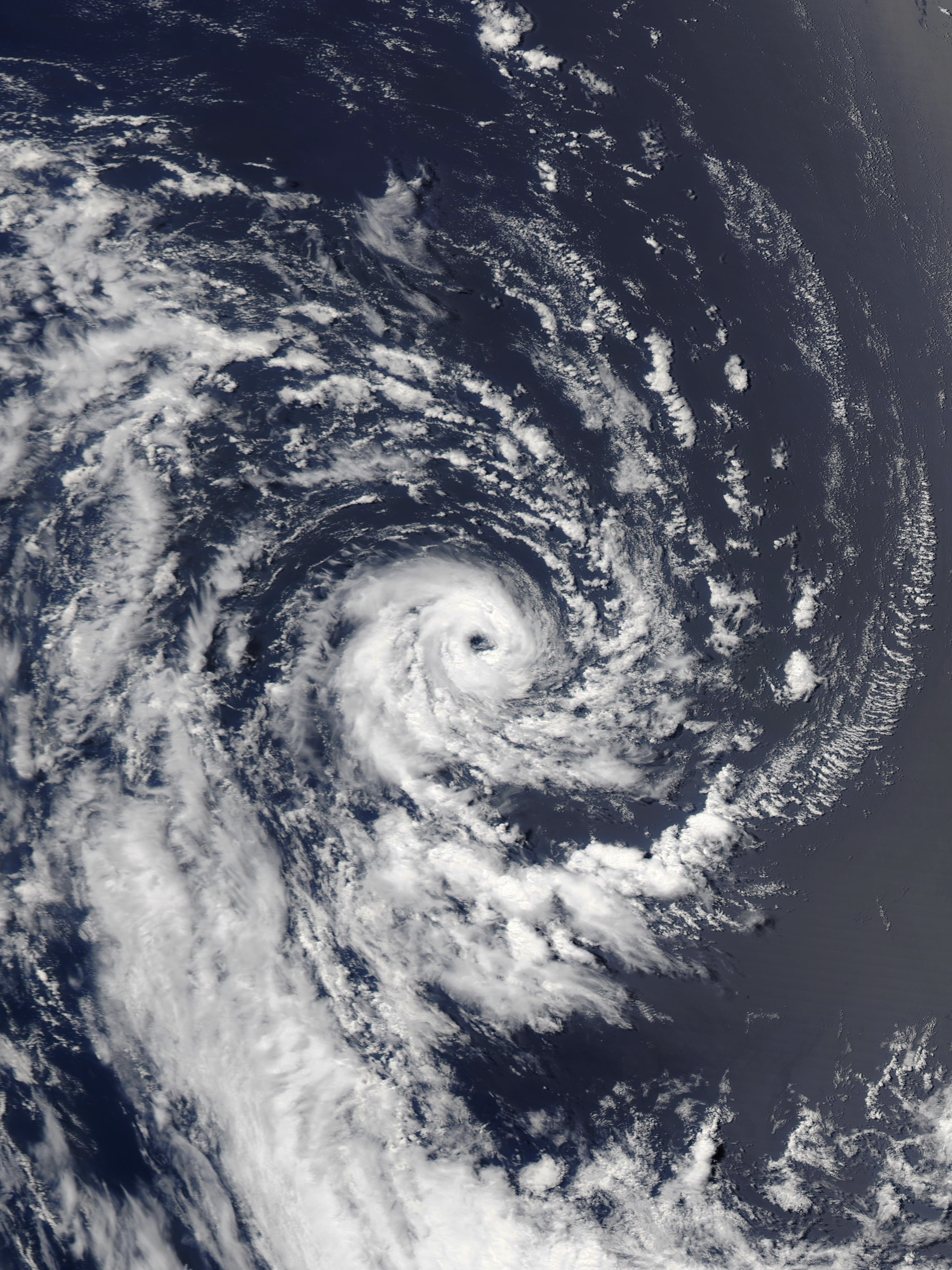
The subtropical storm on January 12, 2022

On January 13, 2022, the Weather Prediction Center (WPC) noted a subtropical storm approximately 440 nmi (810 km; 510 mi) to the west-southwest of the Juan Fernández Islands. The small storm dissipated the next day. Similar to previous storms that formed in this region, it was unofficially named Humberto by researchers, in honor of Humberto Fuenzalida.

== Storm names ==
Within the Southern Pacific, a tropical depression is judged to have reached tropical cyclone intensity should it reach winds of 65 km/h (40 mph) and it is evident that gales are occurring at least halfway around the center. With tropical depressions intensifying into a tropical cyclone between the Equator and 25°S and between 160°E – 120°W named by the FMS. However should a tropical depression intensify to the south of 25°S between 160°E and 120°W it will be named in conjunction with the FMS by MetService. Should a tropical cyclone move out of the basin and into the Australian region it will retain its original name. The names Cody, and Eva, were used for the first time this season (and only in case of Cody), which replaced Cilla and Eseta in the 2002–03 season. The names that were used for 2021–22 season are listed below:

- Cody
- Dovi
- Eva
- Fili
- Gina

If a tropical cyclone enters the South Pacific basin from the Australian region basin (west of 160°E), it will retain the name assigned to it by the BoM. The following storms were named in this manner:

- Ruby

=== Retirement ===
After the season, the name Cody was retired due to the damages it caused, and was replaced with Carol.

== Season effects ==
This table lists all the storms that developed in the South Pacific to the east of longitude 160°E during the 2021–22 season. It includes their intensity on the Australian tropical cyclone intensity scale, duration, name, landfalls, deaths, and damages. All data is taken from RSMC Nadi and/or TCWC Wellington, and all of the damage figures are in 2021 or 2022 USD.

2021–22 South Pacific cyclone season
Name	Dates active	Peak intensity			Areas affected	Damage (US$)	Deaths	Refs
Name	Dates active	Category	Wind speed	Pressure	Areas affected	Damage (US$)	Deaths	Refs
Ruby	December 13 – 15	Category 2 tropical cyclone	110 km/h (70 mph)	975 hPa (28.79 inHg)	New Caledonia	Minimal	None	
02F	December 17 – 20	Tropical disturbance	55 km/h (35 mph)	1004 hPa (29.65 inHg)	None	None	None	
Cody	January 5 – 13	Category 3 severe tropical cyclone	130 km/h (80 mph)	971 hPa (28.67 inHg)	Fiji	$12.9 million	1	
04F	January 15 – 18	Tropical depression	55 km/h (35 mph)	999 hPa (29.50 inHg)	Cook Islands, Niue	None	None	
05F	January 19 – 22	Tropical disturbance	55 km/h (35 mph)	999 hPa (29.50 inHg)	None	None	None	
06F	January 28 – 30	Tropical disturbance	55 km/h (35 mph)	1001 hPa (29.56 inHg)	New Caledonia	None	None	
07F	February 3 – 7	Tropical disturbance	55 km/h (35 mph)	998 hPa (29.47 inHg)	New Caledonia	None	None	
Dovi	February 6 – 12	Category 4 severe tropical cyclone	175 km/h (110 mph)	940 hPa (27.76 inHg)	Vanuatu, New Caledonia; Norfolk Island, New Zealand	$84 million	1	
Eva	February 26 – March 5	Category 1 tropical cyclone	65 km/h (40 mph)	995 hPa (29.38 inHg)	Vanuatu, New Caledonia	Unknown	None	
Fili	April 3 – 9	Category 2 tropical cyclone	110 km/h (70 mph)	977 hPa (28.85 inHg)	New Caledonia	Unknown	None	
Gina	May 16 – 21	Category 1 tropical cyclone	75 km/h (45 mph)	998 hPa (29.47 inHg)	Vanuatu, New Caledonia	Unknown	None	
Season aggregates
11 systems	December 13, 2021 – May 21, 2022		175 km/h (110 mph)	940 hPa (27.76 inHg)		$96.9 million	2	

== See also ==
- Weather of 2021 and 2022
- List of Southern Hemisphere cyclone seasons
- Tropical cyclones in 2021 and 2022
- Atlantic hurricane seasons: 2021, 2022
- Pacific hurricane seasons: 2021, 2022
- Pacific typhoon seasons: 2021, 2022
- North Indian Ocean cyclone seasons: 2021, 2022
- 2021–22 South-West Indian Ocean cyclone season
- 2021–22 Australian region cyclone season
- Unusual areas of tropical cyclone formation
- Subtropical Cyclone Katie
- Subtropical Cyclone Lexi
