= Cyclone Ruby =

Category 2 Australian region and South Pacific cyclone in 2021

Tropical Cyclone Ruby
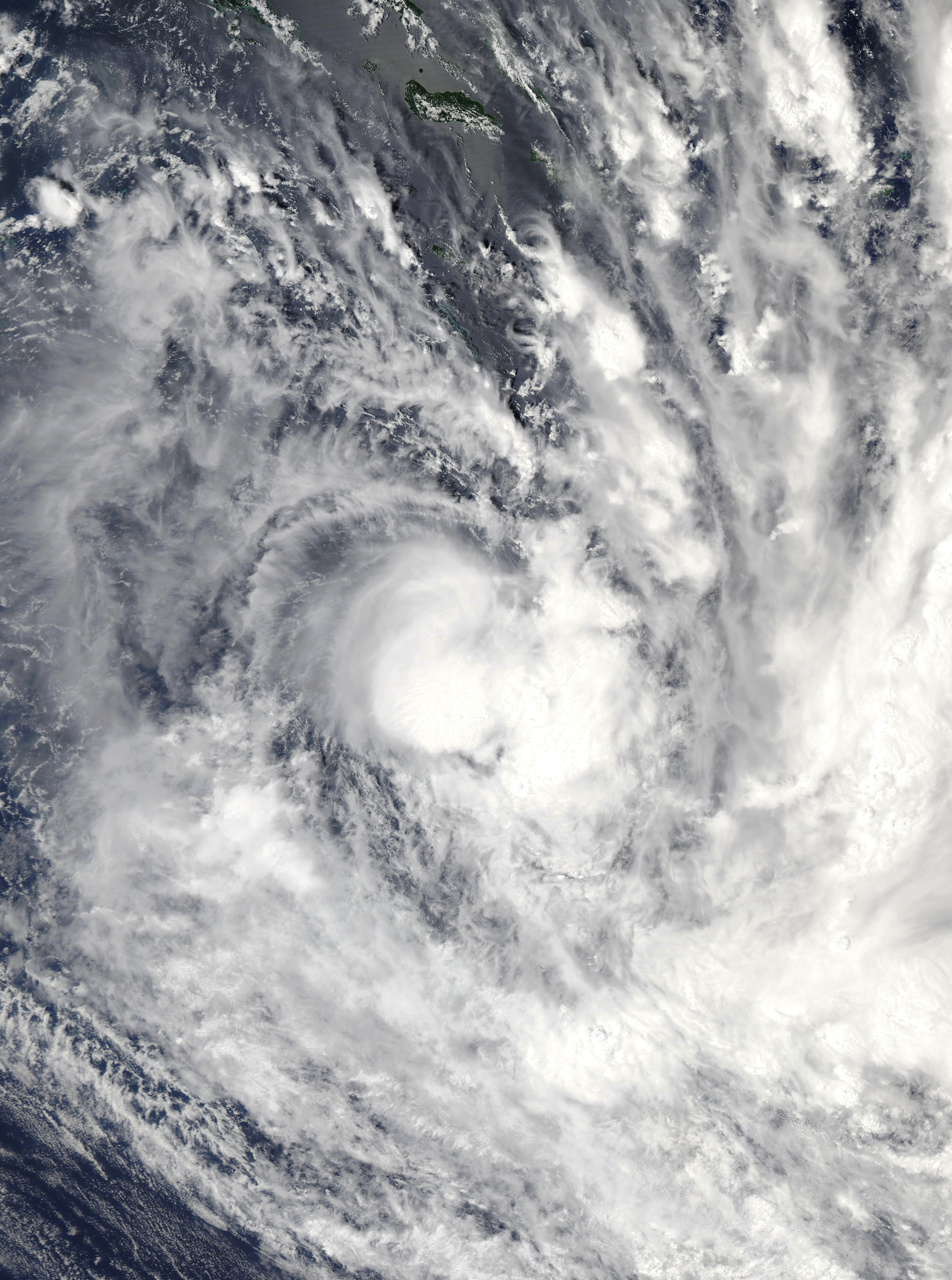
- Cyclone Ruby on 13 December

Meteorological history
- Formed: 9 December 2021
- Extratropical: 15 December 2021
- Dissipated: 17 December 2021

Category 2 tropical cyclone
- 10-minute sustained (FMS)
- Highest winds: 110 km/h (70 mph)
- Lowest pressure: 975 hPa (mbar); 28.79 inHg

Category 1-equivalent tropical cyclone
- 1-minute sustained (SSHWS/JTWC)
- Highest winds: 130 km/h (80 mph)

Overall effects
- Fatalities: None
- Damage: Minimal
- Areas affected: Solomon Islands, New Caledonia
- IBTrACS
- Part of the 2021–22 Australian region and South Pacific cyclone seasons

Tropical Cyclone Ruby was a tropical cyclone which impacted New Caledonia with strong winds and rainfall, after its predecessor tropical low and a nearby trough caused disruption over some parts of the Solomon Islands. The third named system of the 2021-22 Australian region cyclone season and the first cyclone of the 2021-22 South Pacific cyclone season, Ruby formed from an area of convection that was first monitored by the Joint Typhoon Warning Center (JTWC) on 8 December in the Solomon Sea. However, the system didn't officially become a tropical low until 06:00 UTC on 10 December, when the Australian Bureau of Meteorology (BoM) started to issue bulletins on it. After stalling over the area, the storm moved southeastwards over the Coral Sea, where it continued to develop under favorable conditions. The system was finally upgraded to Tropical Cyclone Ruby two days later as gale-force winds encircled its eastern portions.

Wind and rainfall alerts were placed over some islands of the Solomon Islands, due to a trough and the cyclone's predecessor. Two reservoirs, the Kombito and the Kongulai River, were closed and people using the waters of the embankments were advised to boil water as the rivers were contaminated with sediments due to rainfall from the system. Later, cyclone pre-watches were issued for the whole island of New Caledonia as Ruby slowly approached the archipelago, with warnings being further upgraded to Alert Level 2. Flights, ferry and other transportation services were halted as a precaution, and potentially-affected people were evacuated. Over 2,000 residential areas lost electricity as Ruby touched down in the archipelago, with reports of trees being uprooted, in one case damaging a house. Strong winds bashed the northern part of New Caledonia, while the whole portion received heavy rainfall. No deaths were confirmed.

== Meteorological history ==
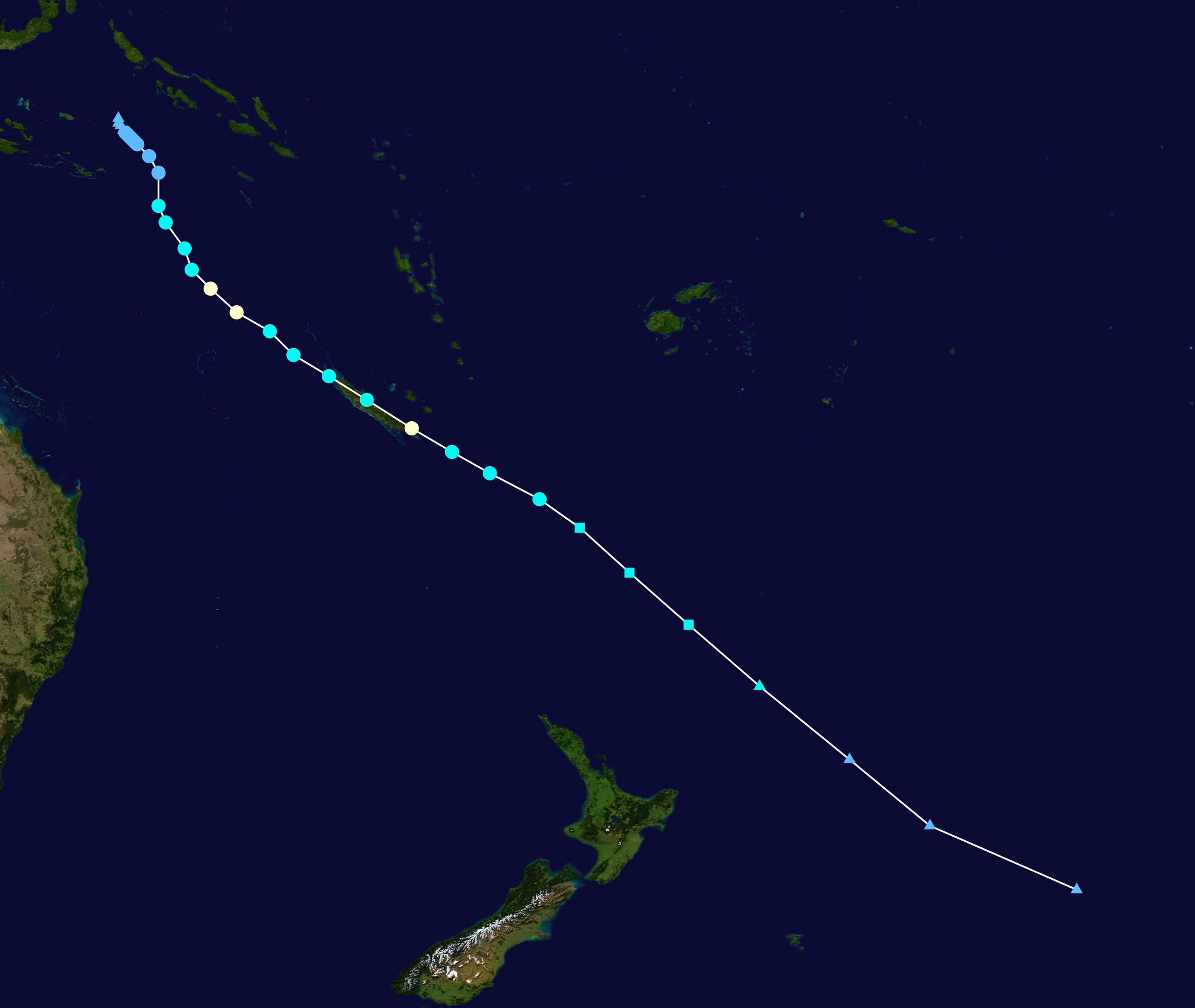
Map plotting the storm's track and intensity, according to the Saffir–Simpson scale Map key Saffir–Simpson scale Tropical depression (≤38 mph, ≤62 km/h) Tropical storm (39–73 mph, 63–118 km/h) Category 1 (74–95 mph, 119–153 km/h) Category 2 (96–110 mph, 154–177 km/h) Category 3 (111–129 mph, 178–208 km/h) Category 4 (130–156 mph, 209–251 km/h) Category 5 (≥157 mph, ≥252 km/h) Unknown Storm type Tropical cyclone Subtropical cyclone Extratropical cyclone, remnant low, tropical disturbance, or monsoon depression

By 6 December, the Australian Bureau of Meteorology was monitoring the Solomon Sea and its adjoining regions for possible tropical development. The next day, the agency noted that this potential system could develop further. Meanwhile, on 8 December at 06:00 UTC, the Joint Typhoon Warning Center started to track the system as "Invest 93P" while it was 225 nautical miles (417 km; 259 mi) to the west of Honiara, Solomon Islands. At that time, the agency noted weak convection winds around a large low-level circulation center. The sprawling disturbance was analyzed as being located in a "marginally favorable" environment by the JTWC, citing low to moderate wind shear and conducive 30–31 °C (86–88 °F) sea surface temperatures. However, the agency only gave the system a "low" chance of developing for the following 24 hours. At 00:00 UTC on the next day, the BoM reported that the system had developed into Tropical Low 07U. The JTWC further upgraded the system's chances of strengthening to "medium" by 06:00 UTC of 9 December, and to "high" by 21:30 UTC with its issuance of a Tropical Cyclone Formation Alert (TCFA). By the next day, the BoM noted that its deep convection had become more organized overnight, and reported that the system was strengthening as it continued to move southeast slowly, before adopting a more southward track under the influence of a mid-level high pressure system to its east. By 00:00 UTC on December 11, gale-force winds briefly developed in 07U's eastern quadrant, but eased three hours later. The BoM put the storm's intensity at that time at 35 kn (65 km/h; 40 mph), below tropical cyclone status.

At 21:00 UTC, the JTWC upgraded the system to a tropical storm more than 767 nautical miles (1,420 km; 883 mi) to the northwest of Noumea, New Caledonia. With improving satellite presentations and Dvorak estimates, the BoM upgraded 07U to a Category 1 tropical cyclone by 00:00 UTC the next day, giving it the name Ruby. Twelve hours later, Ruby intensified into a Category 2 tropical cyclone, based on scatterometer passes. The JTWC then upgraded the system to a Category 1-equivalent tropical cyclone by 21:00 UTC.

At 10:00 AEST (00:00 UTC) of 13 December, Ruby reached its peak intensity, according to the BoM, with maximum 10-minute winds of 60 knots (110 km/h; 69 mph), before moving over the South Pacific basin. At that point, the Australian Bureau of Meteorology passed the responsibility of tracking the system over to the Fiji Meteorological Service.

Upon moving into the South Pacific region, westerly wind shear began to inhibit further intensification, as the influence of a trough passing to the south of Ruby increased. This made the system weaken slightly, with the combination of a mid-level dry air entrainment. At 17:00 UTC (04:00 NCT the next day), Ruby made landfall in Belep, New Caledonia, before moving over Poum an hour later. The JTWC subsequently downgraded Ruby into a tropical storm late on the same day. As the storm emerged from New Caledonia at 06:00 UTC (17:00 NCT) on 14 December, the storm encountered a marginally favorable environment, with high wind shear, cool sea surface temperatures, and dry air entrainment offset by strong poleward outflow. With its deep convection quickly reducing, and the storm's center continuing to elongate, the FMS downgraded Ruby to a Category 1 tropical cyclone 12 hours later. The JTWC issued its final advisory on the storm three hours later, as the storm was already undergoing subtropical transition. The FMS passed the responsibility of warning Ruby to the New Zealand MetService the next day, as it left its area of responsibility towards the south-east. By 06:00 that same day, the MetService reported that Ruby had slightly restrengthened, before reclassifying it as an extratropical cyclone twelve hours later.

== Preparations and impacts ==
=== Solomon Islands ===
Due to the cyclone's tropical low predecessor along with a trough active over the country, the Solomon Islands Meteorological Services issued a strong wind and heavy rain warnings for the archipelago. Individuals living near rivers were also advised to prepare and take the necessary precautions, according to the meteorological agency. Due to the downpour, several sediments contaminated the reservoirs at Kombito and Kongulai Rivers, forcing the water authority of the country to close them and them alerting people to boil their waters for their safety. The newspaper Solomon Star also noted that many children faced vomiting and diarrhea problems due to the incident. By 10 December, the water reservoir at Kongulai was successfully restored.

=== New Caledonia ===
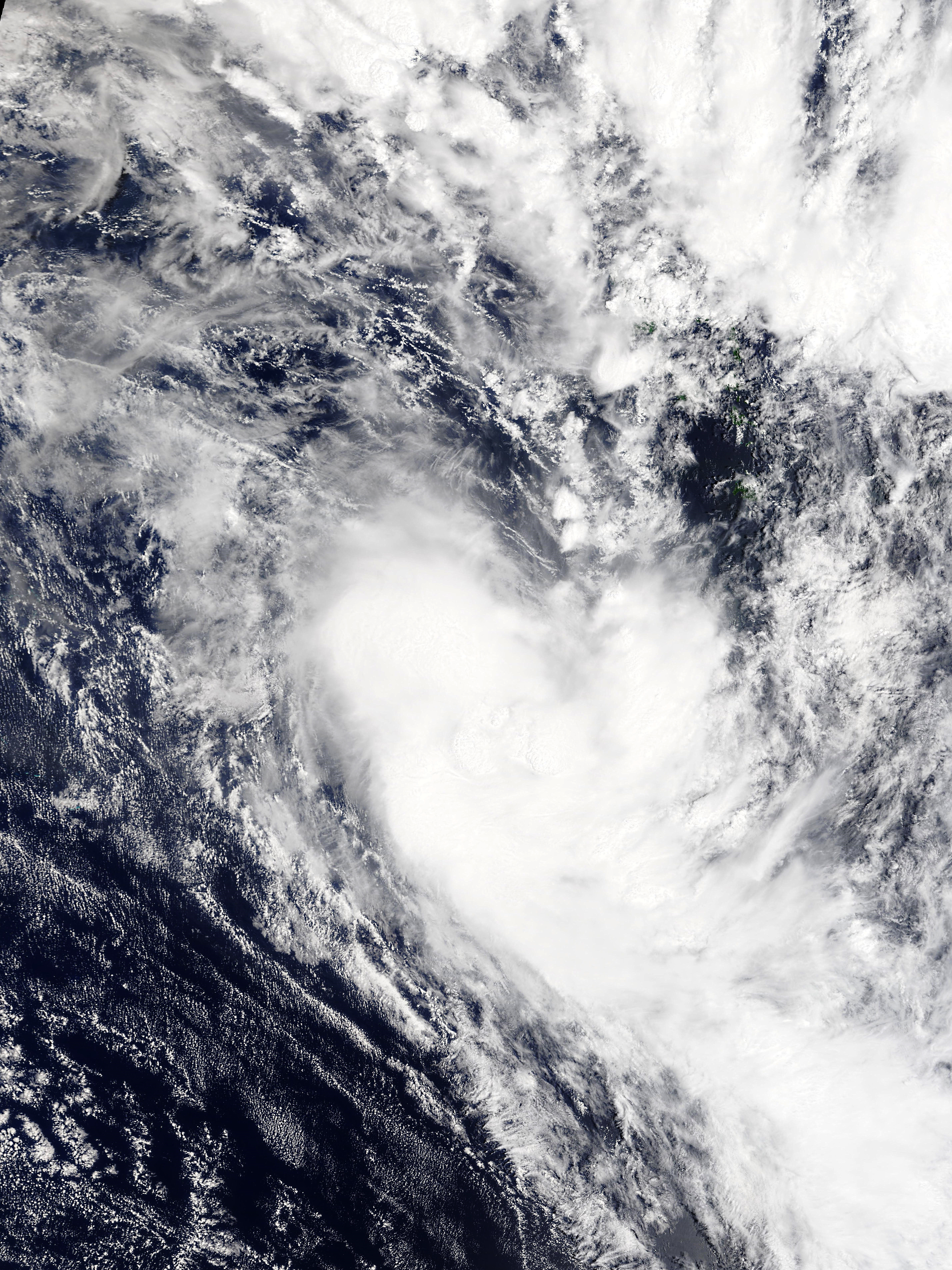
Tropical Cyclone Ruby traversing New Caledonia on 14 December

Winds around 150 kilometres per hour (93 mph) and torrential rainfall were expected in New Caledonia from the storm. By 11 December, the country was placed under a cyclone pre-alert due to the brewing storm, starting at 5:00 NCST (18:00 UTC). 29 municipalities in the country were also placed under "yellow vigilance". Alert Level 1 was also placed over the country's North and South Provinces and further, into Alert Level 2. Ferry services bound for the Isle of Pines, Belep and Ouaième were halted, and Air Calédonie flights for 14 December were canceled. A school building was requested to be an emergency shelter for possible evacuees in Houaïlou, while Kouaoua's town building were used. Four areas in the country's south also offered shelter. Sport areas in Nouméa and some campuses in the University of New Caledonia were closed.

The first impacts from Ruby were felt at the North Province, where strong winds lashed the region. Ruby was the first cyclone to make its landfall in the northern region since Cyclone Frank in 1990. 678 households in Canala, Kaala-Gomen and Koumac lost electricity due to Ruby, and power outages disrupted some reservoirs in Voh. Over 2,569 lost power earlier in these areas. Poingam registered the highest recorded wind gust of the storm, at 185 kilometres per hour (115 mph). Touho got 138 kilometres per hour (86 mph).

Trees were downed across the country, felling power lines. A public highway was impassable in Thia due to a river nearly overflowing. Over a 12-hour period on 14 December, the highest rainfall on the country's west coast was 76.5 millimetres (3.01 in), the highest in the central region was 195.1 millimetres (7.68 in), and the highest on the east coast was 158.4 millimetres (6.24 in). The highest rainfall was reported by a weather station at Rivière Blanche in Yaté, with 303.1 millimetres (11.93 in). 14,864 households lost their power supply due to Ruby.

As the storm moved away from the country, all alerts were lifted and businesses reopened.

== See also ==
- Weather of 2021
- Tropical cyclones in 2021
- Cyclone Niran (2021)
- Cyclone Beni (2003)
