= Cyclone Cody =

Category 3 South Pacific cyclone in 2022

Severe Tropical Cyclone Cody
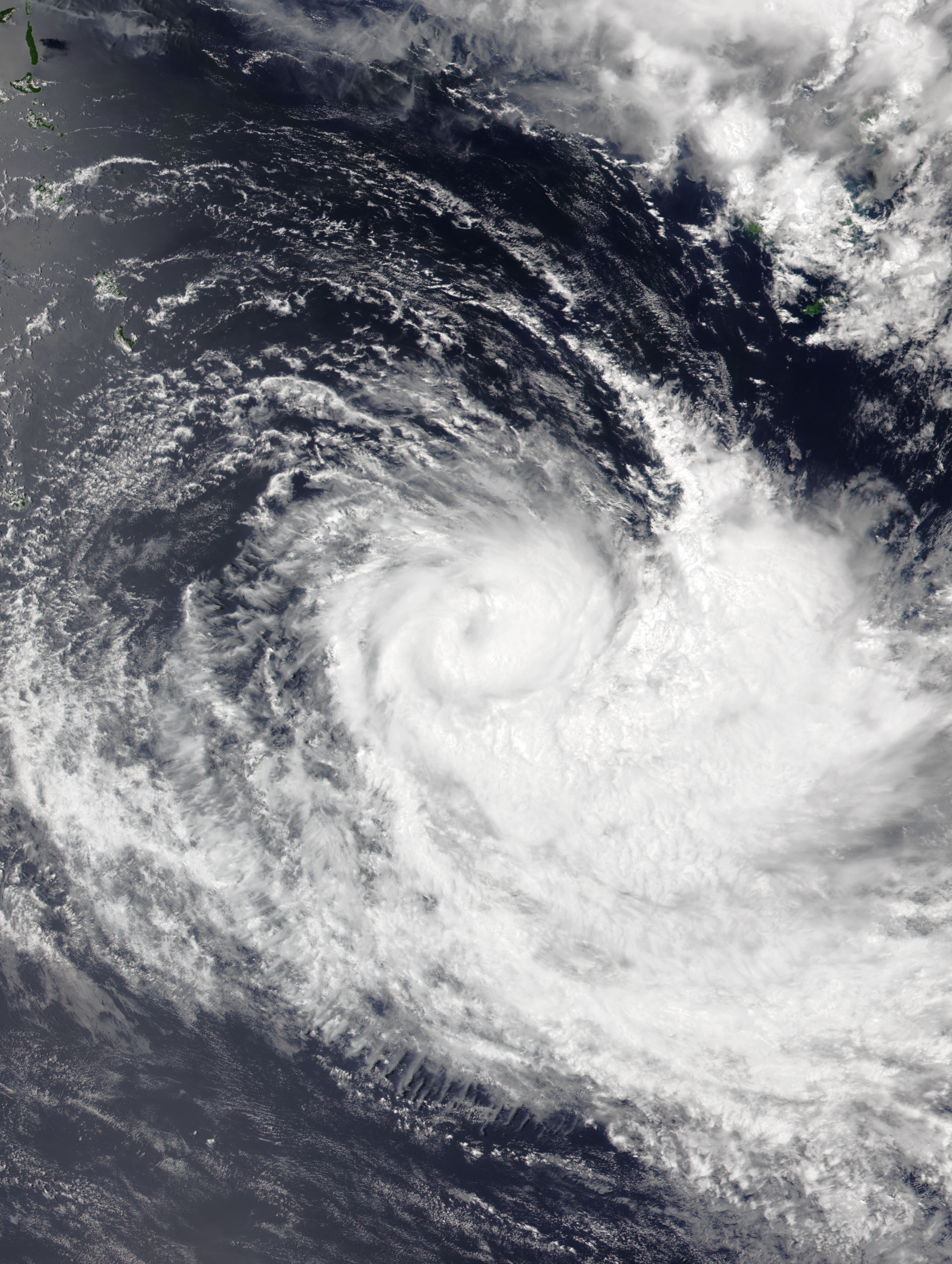
- Severe Tropical Cyclone Cody on 12 January

Meteorological history
- Formed: 5 January 2022
- Extratropical: 14 January 2022
- Dissipated: 19 January 2022

Category 3 severe tropical cyclone
- 10-minute sustained (FMS)
- Highest winds: 130 km/h (80 mph)
- Highest gusts: 185 km/h (115 mph)
- Lowest pressure: 971 hPa (mbar); 28.67 inHg

Tropical storm
- 1-minute sustained (SSHWS/JTWC)
- Highest winds: 110 km/h (70 mph)
- Lowest pressure: 982 hPa (mbar); 29.00 inHg

Overall effects
- Fatalities: 1 total
- Damage: $12.9 million (2022 USD)
- Areas affected: Fiji, New Zealand
- Part of the 2021–22 South Pacific cyclone season

Severe Tropical Cyclone Cody was a strong tropical cyclone in the South Pacific which caused widespread damage in Fiji. The second tropical cyclone and first severe tropical cyclone of the 2021–22 South Pacific cyclone season, Cody was first noted by the Fiji Meteorological Service (FMS) on 5 January as Tropical Disturbance 03F. The tropical depression killed one person, and over 4,500 people were evacuated. On 10 January, the system was upgraded to a Category 1 tropical cyclone by the FMS, receiving the name Cody. While the FMS recorded a peak intensity of 130 km/h (80 mph), the Joint Typhoon Warning Center (JTWC) only recorded a peak intensity of 95 km/h (60 mph). Cody was the first tropical cyclone in 2022.

== Meteorological history ==
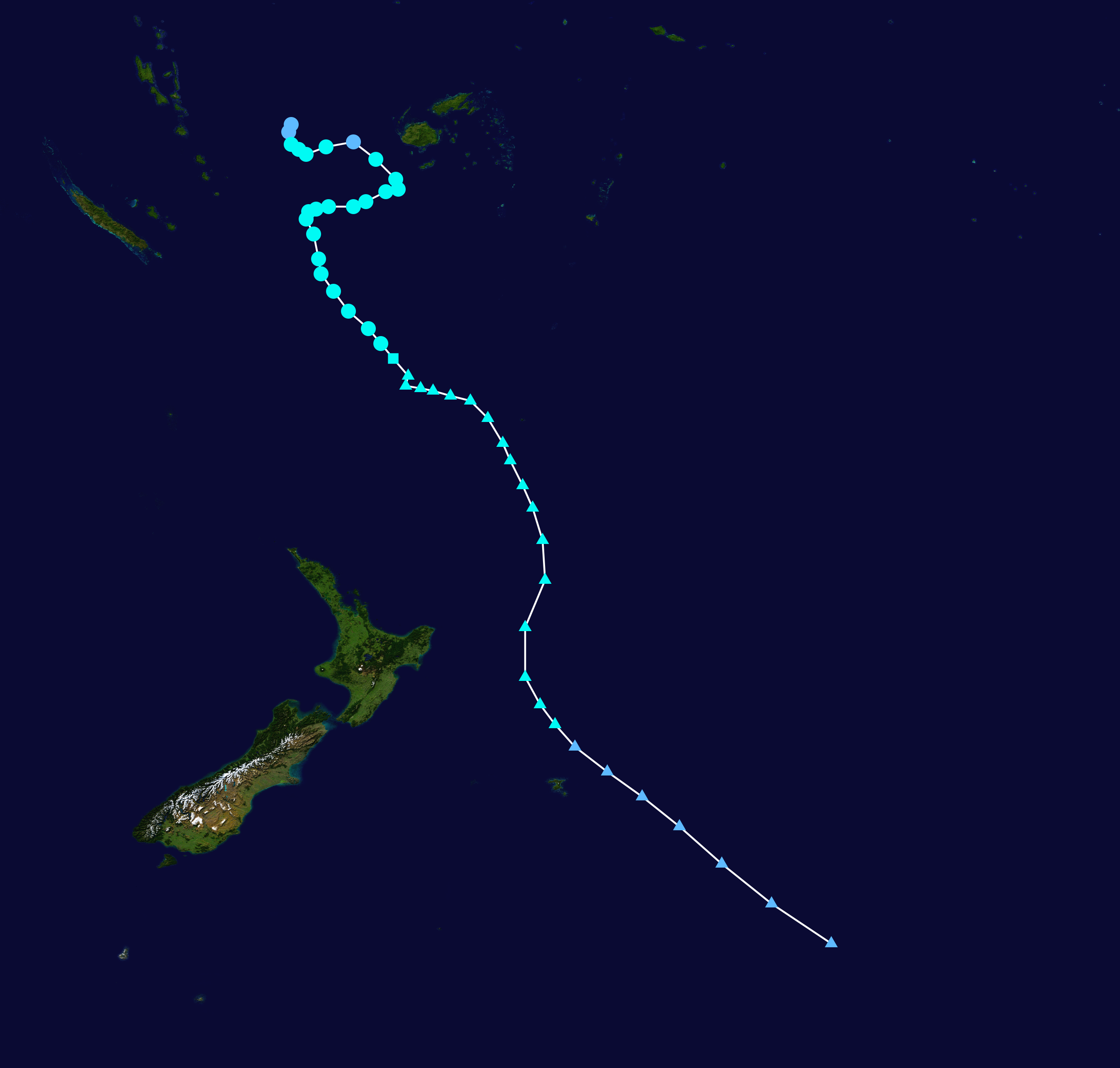
Map plotting the storm's track and intensity, according to the Saffir–Simpson scale Map key Saffir–Simpson scale Tropical depression (≤38 mph, ≤62 km/h) Tropical storm (39–73 mph, 63–118 km/h) Category 1 (74–95 mph, 119–153 km/h) Category 2 (96–110 mph, 154–177 km/h) Category 3 (111–129 mph, 178–208 km/h) Category 4 (130–156 mph, 209–251 km/h) Category 5 (≥157 mph, ≥252 km/h) Unknown Storm type Tropical cyclone Subtropical cyclone Extratropical cyclone, remnant low, tropical disturbance, or monsoon depression

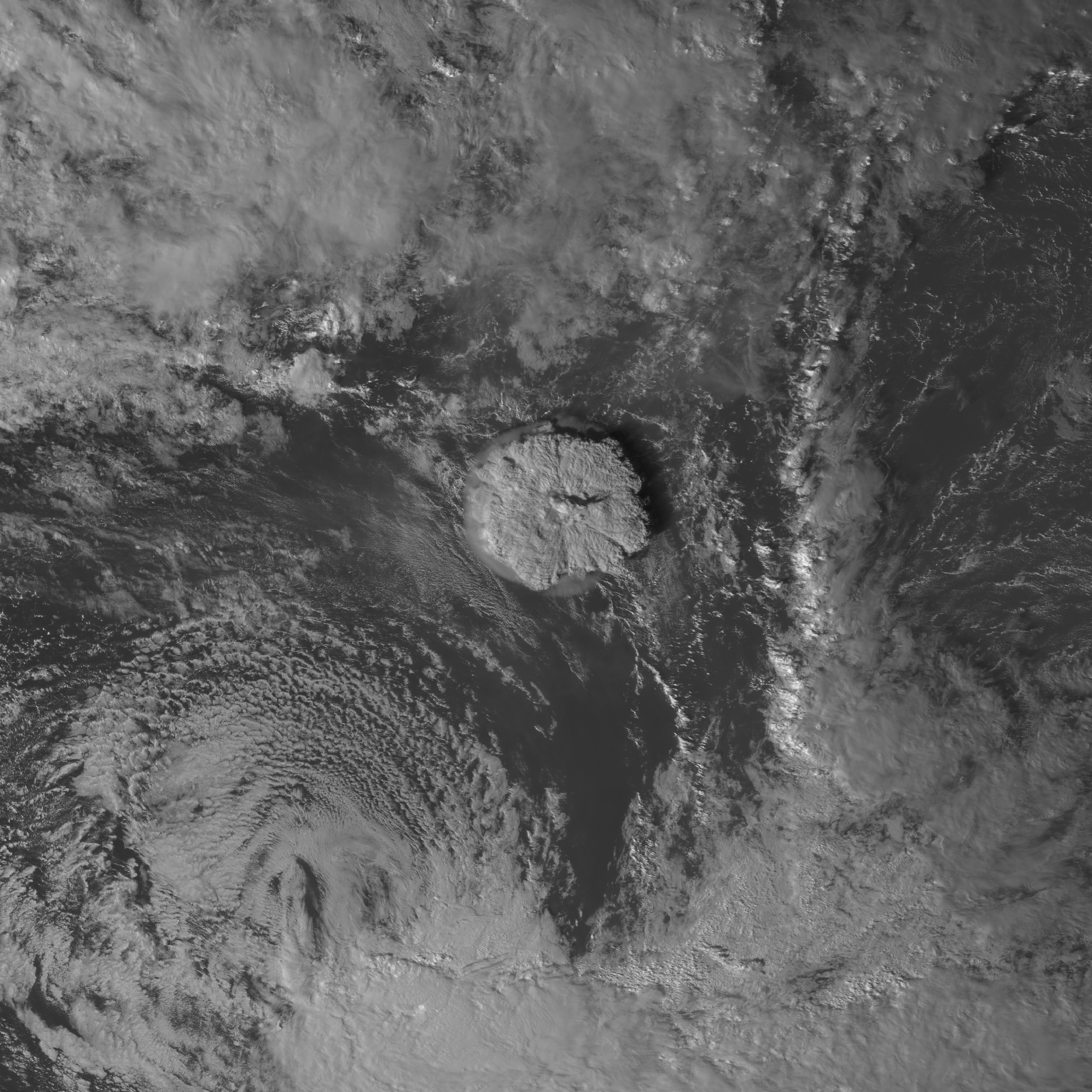
A satellite image of the Hunga Tonga eruption with the remnants of Tropical Cyclone Cody to its southwest late on 15 January.

The origins of Cyclone Cody can be traced back to an area of low pressure near the Fijian dependency of Rotuma late on 3 January. Two days later, on 5 January, the Fiji Meteorological Service (FMS) began tracking the system, now located about 640 km (400 mi) to the north of Nadi, Fiji, and designated it as Tropical Disturbance 03F. At the time, it was embedded within a trough, with cloud bands associated to the South Pacific convergence zone wrapping into the system, while under an environment of moderate to strong divergence, low to moderate wind shear, and good outflow. Later that day, the Joint Typhoon Warning Center (JTWC) began monitoring the disturbance, although increasing shear slowed its development. Over the next few days, it tracked southwest under 29–30 °C (84–86 °F) sea surface temperatures, with flaring deep convection wrapping to its centre. At 00:00 UTC on 8 January, the FMS upgraded 03F to a tropical depression, as cooling cloud tops wrapped over its centre from the northern side. At the same time, the JTWC upgraded 03F to a tropical storm; operationally, they issued a Tropical Cyclone Formation Alert (TCFA) 14 hours later, due to gale-force winds developing over the eastern side of the system, before issuing advisories on the storm at 21:00 UTC the same day. Turning eastward within a competing steering pattern between the near-equatorial ridge to its northeast and the subtropical ridge to its south, it briefly weakened to a tropical depression by 9 January, as dry air hindered the development of its centre, before the JTWC reupgraded it to a tropical storm at 06:00 UTC. During the day, 03F passed within 180 km (110 mi) to the southwest of Nadi.

At 18:00 UTC that same day, as it turned to the southwest along the periphery of the subtropical ridge to its south, the FMS reported that 03F intensified to a Category 1 tropical cyclone on the Australian tropical cyclone scale, and named it as Cody. Cody's centre remained exposed throughout 10 January, as dry air intruded the system's core. By the next day, convection began to reform over its centre, signaling the system's reintensification. At 06:00 UTC, Cody intensified into a category 2 tropical cyclone, as ragged convection began to wrap around its centre. By 12 January, at 00:00 UTC, Cody reached its peak intensity, as it became a category 3 severe tropical cyclone with 10-minute sustained winds of 70 kn (130 km/h; 80 mph). The JTWC estimated the system to have 1-minute sustained winds of 60 kn (110 km/h; 70 mph), just shy of a hurricane-equivalent cyclone on the Saffir-Simpson scale. At the time of its peak intensity, Cody developed a 74-kilometre-wide (46 mi) banding eye, as it moved into an environment of lowering sea surface temperatures and increasing shear.

Its peak intensity was short-lived because 12 hours later, Cody weakened to a category 2 tropical cyclone due to a dry air intrusion from the west, along with strong shear as it turned to the southeast. Cody further weakened to a category 1 tropical cyclone by 18:00 UTC, before the FMS passed the responsibility of issuing warnings to the New Zealand MetService, as it left their area of responsibility by the next day. As it left the FMS's area of responsibility, the system's centre became broad and fully exposed, with convection sheared to the southeast. At 15:00 UTC, the JTWC issued their final advisory on Cody, as it transitioned to a subtropical low. The MetService then reclassified Cody as a gale-force low 3 hours later. The remnants of the system continued southeast, passing near New Zealand by 17 January, before being last noted late on the same day as a gale-force low to the north of the Chatham Islands.

== Preparations and impact ==
=== Fiji ===
As the precursor system began to form near Fiji, the FMS issued a heavy rain alert for Vanua Levu, Taveuni and nearby islands, and the Lau and Lomaiviti group of islands on 4 January. By the next day, the alert was expanded to include all of Fiji, before a heavy rain warning was issued to the same initial areas early on 6 January. As it became a tropical disturbance on 8 January, the FMS issued a severe flood alert for low-lying areas near major rivers in Viti Levu. By the afternoon, a flood warning was issued for the towns of Rakiraki, Tavua and Ba, alongside flash flood warnings in most of Fiji, and tropical cyclone alerts for Yasawa and Mamanuca group of islands, northern and western Viti Levu, Kadavu, and western and northwestern Vanua Levu.

One person was killed as a result of the cyclone, with over 4,500 people evacuated in Fiji. Infrastructural damage of Cody amounted at be FJ$27.5 million (US$12.9 million).

=== Elsewhere ===
The tsunami that was caused by the eruption of Hunga Tonga–Hunga Ha'apai on 15 January was amplified in New Zealand as a result of the storm surge created by Cyclone Cody.

== Retirement ==
Due to its onslaught, the name Cody was officially retired from the naming list after the 2021-22 season despite its first usage. It was replaced by Carol.

== See also ==
- Weather of 2022
- Tropical cyclones in 2022
