= List of storms named Dovi =

The name Dovi has been used for three tropical cyclones in the South Pacific Ocean.

- Cyclone Dovi (1988) – a Category 2 tropical cyclone that passed near Vanuatu.
- Cyclone Dovi (2003) – a Category 5 severe tropical cyclone that affected the southern Cook Islands and Niue.
- Cyclone Dovi (2022) – a Category 4 severe tropical cyclone that passed through New Caledonia.
