= 2022 Pacific hurricane season =

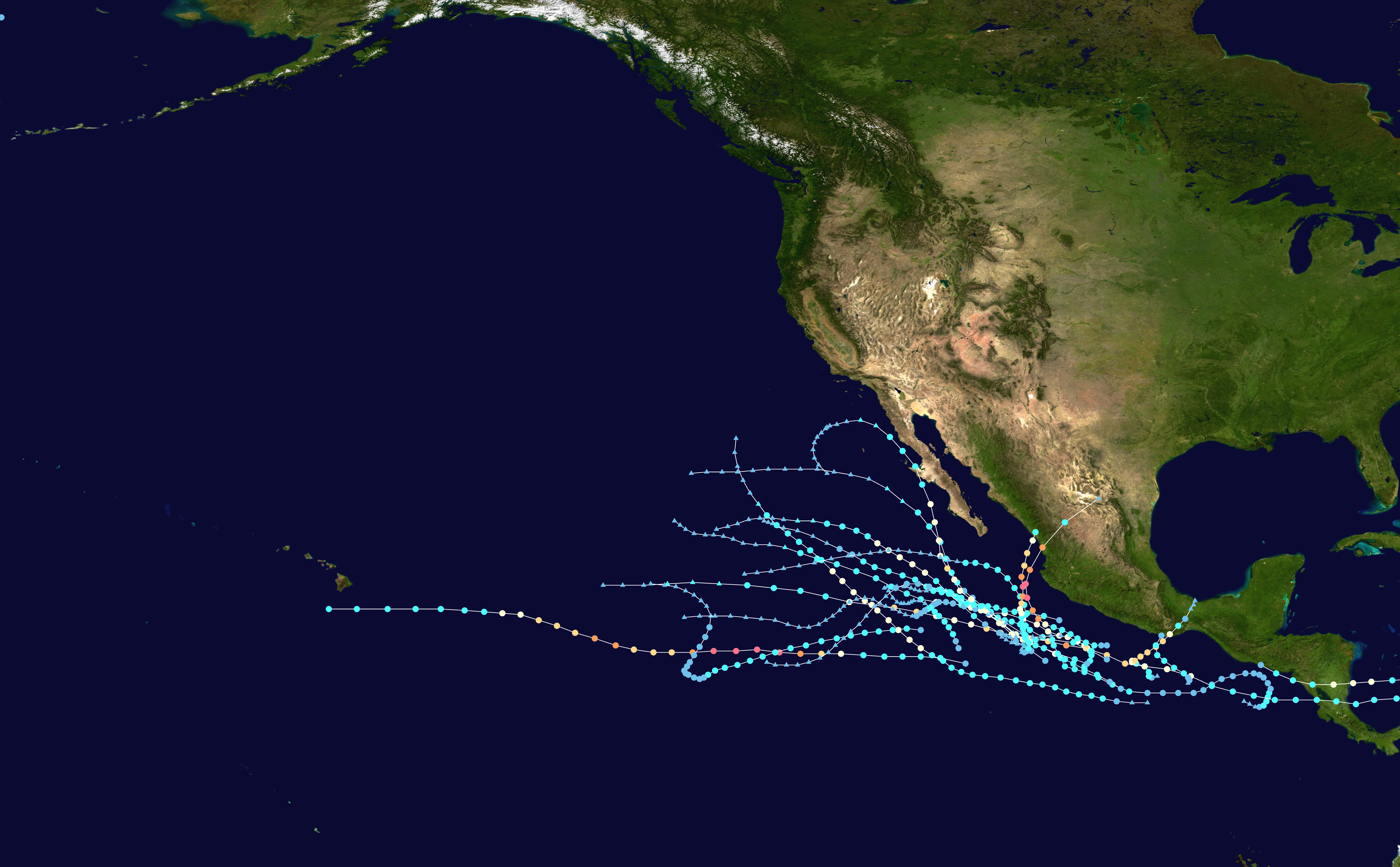
- Season summary map

Seasonal boundaries
- First system formed: May 28, 2022
- Last system dissipated: October 23, 2022

Strongest storm
- Name: Darby
  - Maximum winds: 140 mph (220 km/h) (1-minute sustained)
  - Lowest pressure: 953 mbar (hPa; 28.14 inHg)

Seasonal statistics
- Total depressions: 19
- Total storms: 19
- Hurricanes: 10
- Major hurricanes (Cat. 3+): 4
- ACE: 114.6
- Total fatalities: 32 total
- Total damage: > $447 million (2022 USD)

Related articles
- Timeline of the 2022 Pacific hurricane season; 2022 Atlantic hurricane season; 2022 Pacific typhoon season; 2022 North Indian Ocean cyclone season

The 2022 Pacific hurricane season was a slightly above average hurricane season in the eastern North Pacific basin (east of 140°W), with nineteen named storms, ten hurricanes, and four major hurricanes. Two of the storms crossed into the basin from the Atlantic. In the central North Pacific basin (between 140°W and the International Date Line), no tropical cyclones formed (for the third consecutive season). The season officially began on May 15 in the eastern Pacific, and on June 1 in the central; both ended on November 30. These dates historically describe the period each year when most tropical cyclogenesis occurs in these regions of the Pacific and are adopted by convention.

The first named storm of the season, Hurricane Agatha, formed on May 28, and made landfall two days later at Category 2 strength on the Saffir–Simpson scale, making it the strongest hurricane on record to make landfall during the month of May in the Eastern Pacific basin. In June, Hurricane Blas and Tropical Storm Celia caused heavy rainfall over southwestern Mexico despite remaining offshore. The season's first major hurricane, Hurricane Bonnie, moved offshore Nicaragua as a tropical storm on July 2, becoming the first storm to survive the crossover from the Atlantic to the Pacific intact since Hurricane Otto in 2016. In September, tropical storms Javier, Lester, and Madeline all caused flooding across the Pacific coast of Mexico, though none left severe damage. Hurricane Kay also formed that month, and struck the Baja California Peninsula before bringing gale-force winds to the west coast of the continental United States, becoming the first Pacific hurricane to do so since Hurricane Nora 25 years earlier.

In early October, Hurricane Orlene became a Category 4 hurricane before weakening and making landfall in Sinaloa as a Category 1 hurricane, resulting in heavy rainfall and flooding. Also, Hurricane Julia became the second storm of the season to cross over from the Atlantic basin intact, and made landfall in El Salvador soon thereafter. In late October, Hurricane Roslyn became the fourth major hurricane of the season, and went on to become the strongest landfalling Pacific hurricane since Hurricane Patricia in 2015.

== Seasonal forecasts ==
| Record | | Named storms | Hurricanes | Major hurricanes | Ref |
|---|---|---|---|---|---|
| Average (1991–2020): | | 15 | 8 | 4 | |
| Record high activity: | | 1992: 27 | 2015: 16 | 2015: 11 | |
| Record low activity: | | 2010: 8 | 2010: 3 | 2003: 0 | |
| Date | Source | Named storms | Hurricanes | Major hurricanes | Ref |
| May 17, 2022 | SMN | 14–19 | 6–9 | 2–4 | |
| May 24, 2022 | NOAA | 10–17 | 4–8 | 0–3 | |
| | Area | Named storms | Hurricanes | Major hurricanes | Ref |
| Actual activity: | EPAC | 19 | 10 | 4 | |
| Actual activity: | CPAC | 0 | 0 | 0 | |
| Actual combined activity: | | 19 | 10 | 4 | |

Forecasts include weekly and monthly changes in important factors that help determine the number of tropical storms, hurricanes, and major hurricanes within a particular year. According to the National Oceanic and Atmospheric Administration (NOAA), the average hurricane season in the Eastern and Central Pacific between 1991 and 2020 contained approximately 15 tropical storms, 8 hurricanes, and 4 major hurricanes. The NOAA generally classifies a season as above average, average, or below average based on the cumulative ACE index, but occasionally the number of tropical storms, hurricanes, and major hurricanes within a hurricane season is also considered. Factors they expected to reduce activity were near- or below-average sea surface temperatures across the eastern Pacific and the El Niño–Southern Oscillation remaining in the neutral phase, with the possibility of a La Niña developing, corresponding to a low chance of an El Niño.

On May 17, 2022, the Servicio Meteorológico Nacional (SMN) issued its forecast for the season, predicting a total of 14–19 named storms, 6–9 hurricanes, and 2–4 major hurricanes to develop. On May 24, 2022, the National Oceanic and Atmospheric Administration (NOAA) issued their outlook, calling for a below-normal season with 10–17 named storms, 4–8 hurricanes, 0–3 major hurricanes, and an accumulated cyclone energy index of 45% to 100% of the median.

== Seasonal summary ==
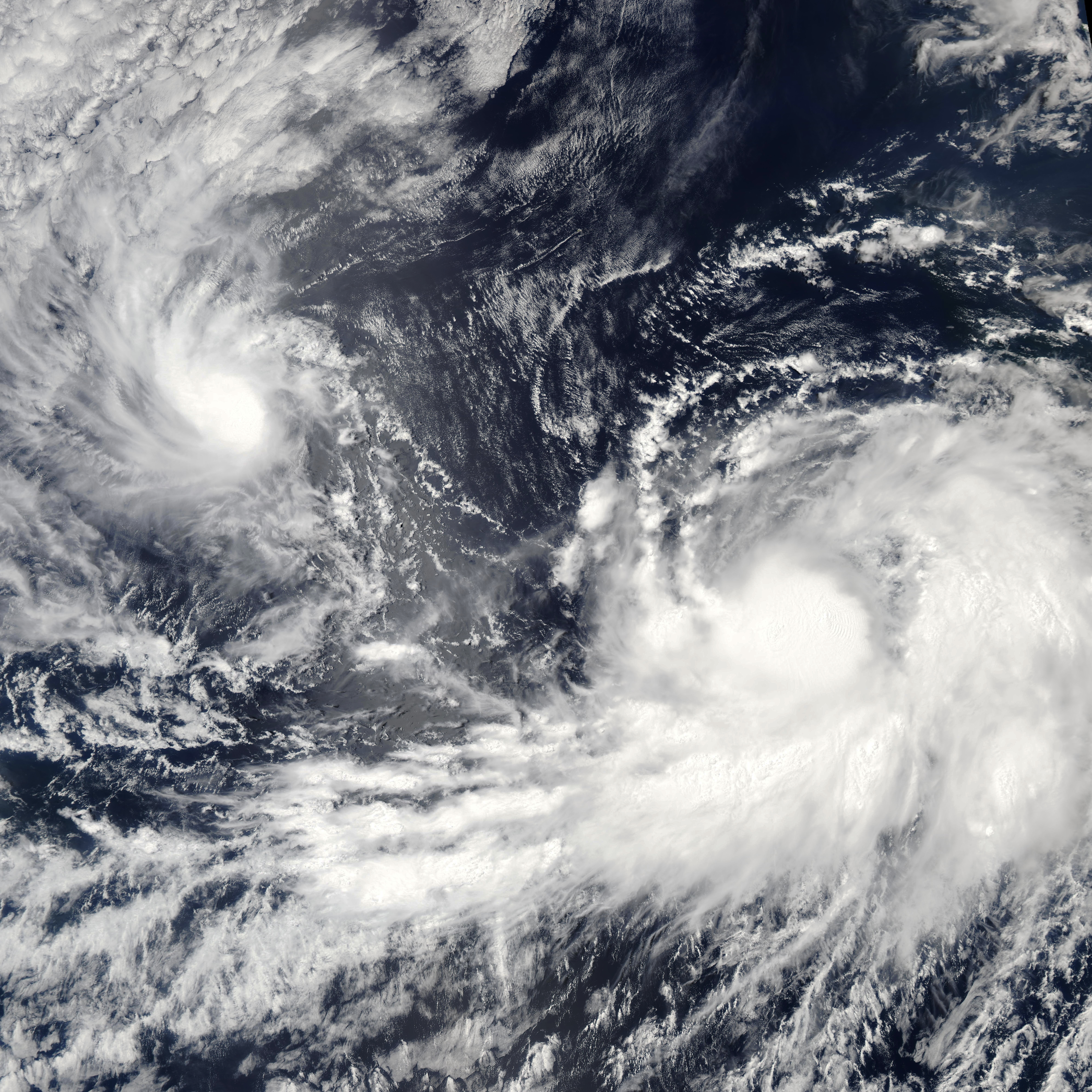
Left to right: Tropical Storm Georgette and Tropical Storm Frank on July 28

The season began with the formation and development of Hurricane Agatha on May 28, which rapidly intensified to a high-end Category 2 hurricane before making landfall along the coast of southwestern Mexico two days later. This marked the strongest Pacific hurricane to make landfall during the month of May since records began in 1949. Activity continued into June with the formation of Hurricane Blas, which caused four deaths while offshore of southwestern Mexico, and Tropical Storm Celia, which meandered across the basin for twelve days in late June. Four days after Celia dissipated, Tropical Storm Bonnie became the first to survive the crossover from the Atlantic to the Pacific since Hurricane Otto in 2016. It also became the season's first major hurricane. The same day Bonnie dissipated, the depression that would become Hurricane Darby formed. The storm rapidly intensified into the strongest storm of the season late on July 11, attaining sustained winds of 140 mph (220 km/h) while moving out to sea. Several days later, Hurricane Estelle formed and paralleled the coast of Mexico. After a brief period without any active tropical cyclones, Hurricane Frank and Tropical Storm Georgette formed later in the month. They were followed by two systems during the first half of August, Hurricane Howard and Tropical Storm Ivette.

September was the peak month for tropical cyclogenesis in 2022, with six systems developing. Tropical Storm Javier and then Hurricane Kay both formed off the coast of southwestern Mexico during the first week of the month and paralleled the coast offshore. Kay, the longer-lived and stronger of the two, became the first tropical cyclone to extend its effects northward into Southern California since Nora in 1997. This pace of storm development continued with the mid-month formations of tropical storms Lester and Madeline, which caused flooding and a combined 8 fatalities in Mexico, after Lester made landfall there and Madeline passed closely offshore. Madeline's dissipation was closely followed by the formation of Tropical Storm Newton and then Hurricane Orlene to close out the month. A Category 4 hurricane, Orlene became the most intense storm of the season, attaining a minimum pressure of 949 mbar (28.02 inHg), before ultimately making landfall in southern Sinaloa at Category 1 strength.

October began with Tropical Storm Paine, a weak and short-lived system that remained away from land. Shortly thereafter, Hurricane Julia became the second storm of the season to cross over into the Pacific basin intact from the Atlantic. Not since 1996 has more than one storm crossed between the Atlantic and Pacific basins intact during a single season. Later in the month, Hurricane Roslyn paralleled the coast of Western Mexico before making landfall in Nayarit with 120 mph (195 km/h) winds. It was the strongest hurricane to make landfall in the eastern Pacific since Hurricane Patricia in 2015, which struck about 175 mi (280 km) south of where Roslyn did. No named storms formed in the month of November for the first time since 2017.

The accumulated cyclone energy (ACE) index for the 2022 Pacific hurricane season, as calculated by Colorado State University using data from the NHC, was 116.5 units, the highest since 2018. (Note: The total represents the sum of the squares of the maximum sustained wind speed (knots) for every (sub)tropical storm's intensity of over 33 knots (38 mph; 61 km/h), divided by 10,000 while they are above that threshold; therefore, tropical depressions are not included.) This level of activity was near the long-term (1991–2020) average.

== Systems ==
=== Hurricane Agatha ===
- Category 2 hurricane (SSHWS)
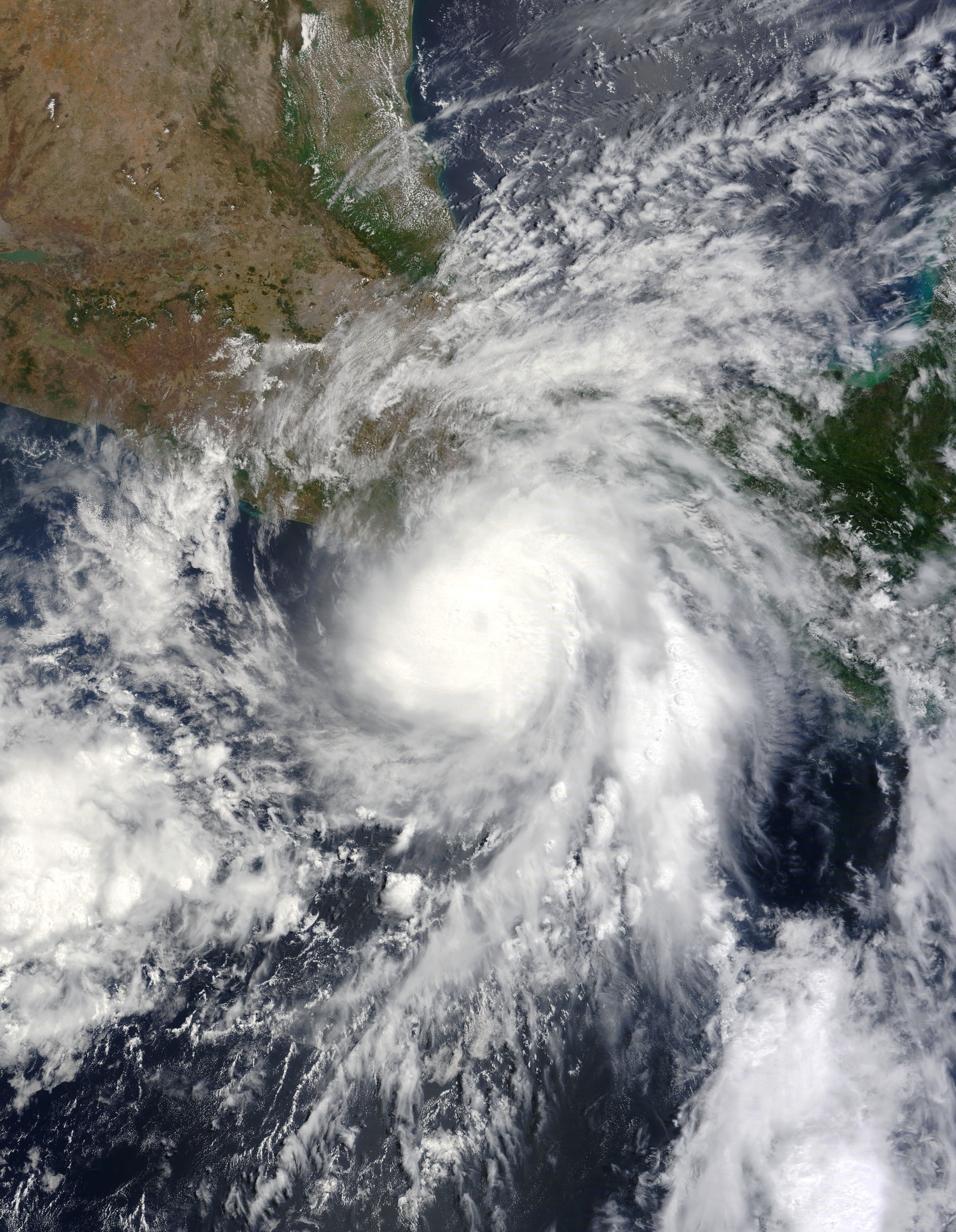
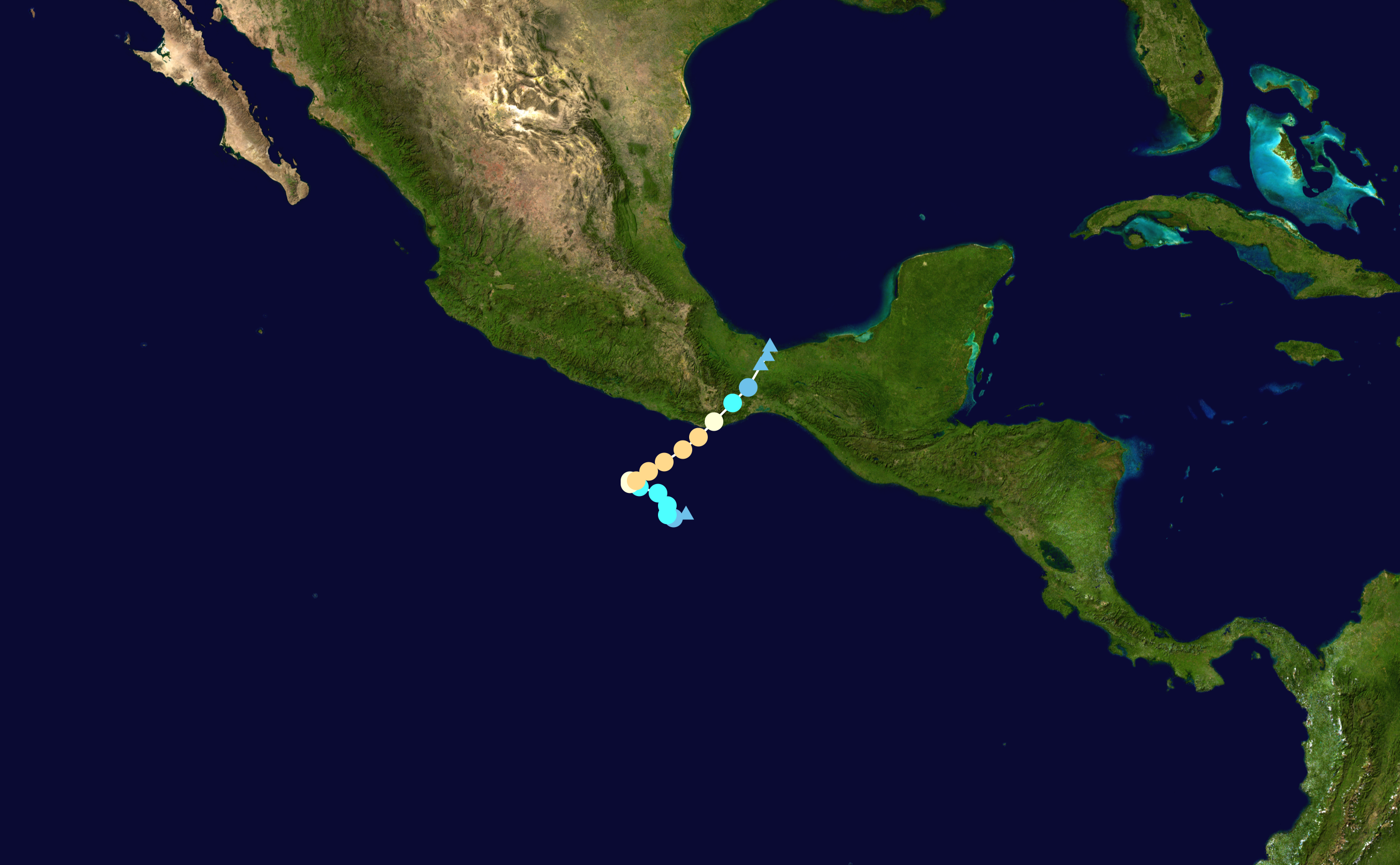
- Duration: May 28 – May 31
- Peak intensity: 110 mph (175 km/h) (1-min); 964 mbar (hPa)

Beginning on May 17, convection began to increase with the Intertropical Convergence Zone stretching from the southwestern Caribbean Sea into the East Pacific basin. An area of low pressure soon developed and further organized into the season's first tropical depression to the south-southwest of the Mexico coastline early on May 28. Within hours, it strengthened into Tropical Storm Agatha. The newly-formed storm moved erratically during its early stages but eventually curved to the northeast. A very favorable environment allowed the system to begin a prolonged period of rapid intensification on May 29; it became the season's first hurricane during the early morning hours and reached its peak intensity at Category 2 strength with winds of 110 mph (180 km/h) by the afternoon. An increase in westerly wind shear and the onset of an eyewall replacement cycle temporarily caused the hurricane to weaken. However, it regained some strength on approach to the coastline of Mexico, and it moved onshore near La Redonda with 105 mph (169 km/h) winds around 21:00 UTC on May 30. The system's center decayed over land and dissipated on June 1 as it became absorbed in developing Tropical Storm Alex to the northeast.

Storm surge near where Agatha's core made landfall caused beach erosion and some additional damage. Torrential rainfall across Oaxaca, peaking at 17.84 inches (453.1 mm) in Santa María Tonameca, triggered landslides and flash flooding in many parts of the state. Strong winds caused additional damage to infrastructure. Agatha killed nine people, all in the Sierra Madre del Sur, and six others remained missing.

=== Hurricane Blas ===
- Category 1 hurricane (SSHWS)
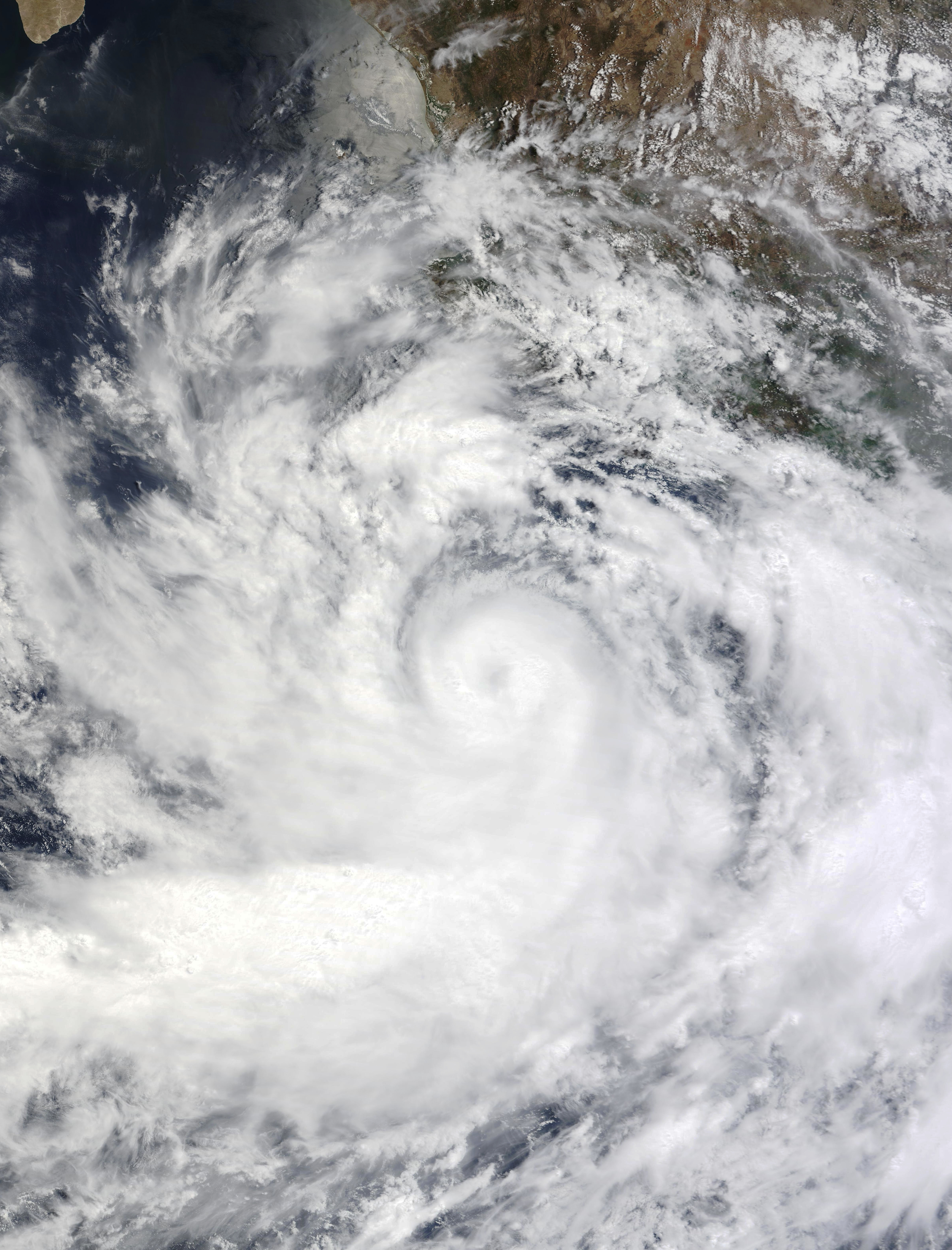
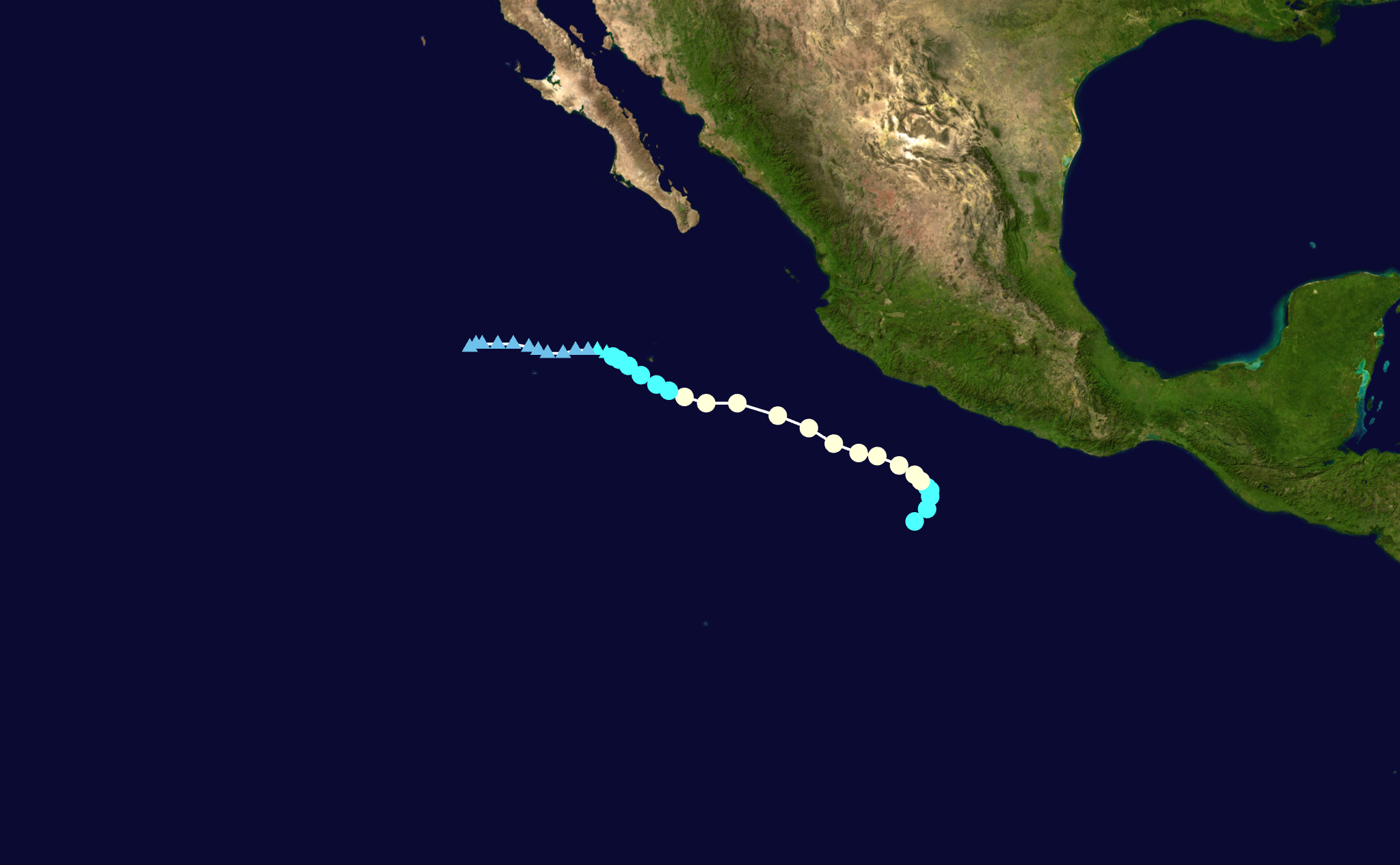
- Duration: June 14 – June 19
- Peak intensity: 85 mph (140 km/h) (1-min); 978 mbar (hPa)

An area of disturbed weather formed within the monsoon trough a couple of hundred miles offshore the coast of southern Mexico on June 10. The system slowly organized while it moved west, developing into Tropical Storm Blas at 06:00 UTC on June 14. Weak steering currents directed the system to curve north-northeast before sending it back westward. Blas tracked within an environment of warm sea surface temperatures and low to moderate wind shear, allowing it to rapidly become a hurricane on June 15 and reach peak winds of 85 miles per hour (137 km/h) that afternoon as it displayed a well-defined inner core structure. Increasing shear caused the hurricane to fluctuate in intensity through June 17, until cold waters led to a sustained weakening phase. At 18:00 UTC on June 19, Blas degenerated to a remnant low to the southwest of the Baja California peninsula. It continued west until dissipating on June 23.

Moisture from Blas combined with a nearby tropical wave interacted with the mountainous terrain of southwestern Mexico, resulting in heavy rainfall along the coast despite the hurricane remaining well offshore. A peak accumulation of 12.60 inches (320.0 mm) was measured in Laguna de Coyuca. This rain led to river flooding, flash flooding, and landslides, particularly across the states of Michoacán and Guerrero. A couple of dozen vehicles were stranded in flooded neighborhoods near Acapulco, where a sinkhole was reported on the Acapulco-Zihuatanejo Bypass. The bodies of two individuals were discovered near the city, but their cause of death is unknown, as is any possible relation with the hurricane. A few trees, fences, and utility poles were downed by gusty winds. Along the coast, large waves and rough surf resulted in minor beach erosion. Overall damage, though, was relatively minimal.

=== Tropical Storm Celia ===
- Tropical storm (SSHWS)
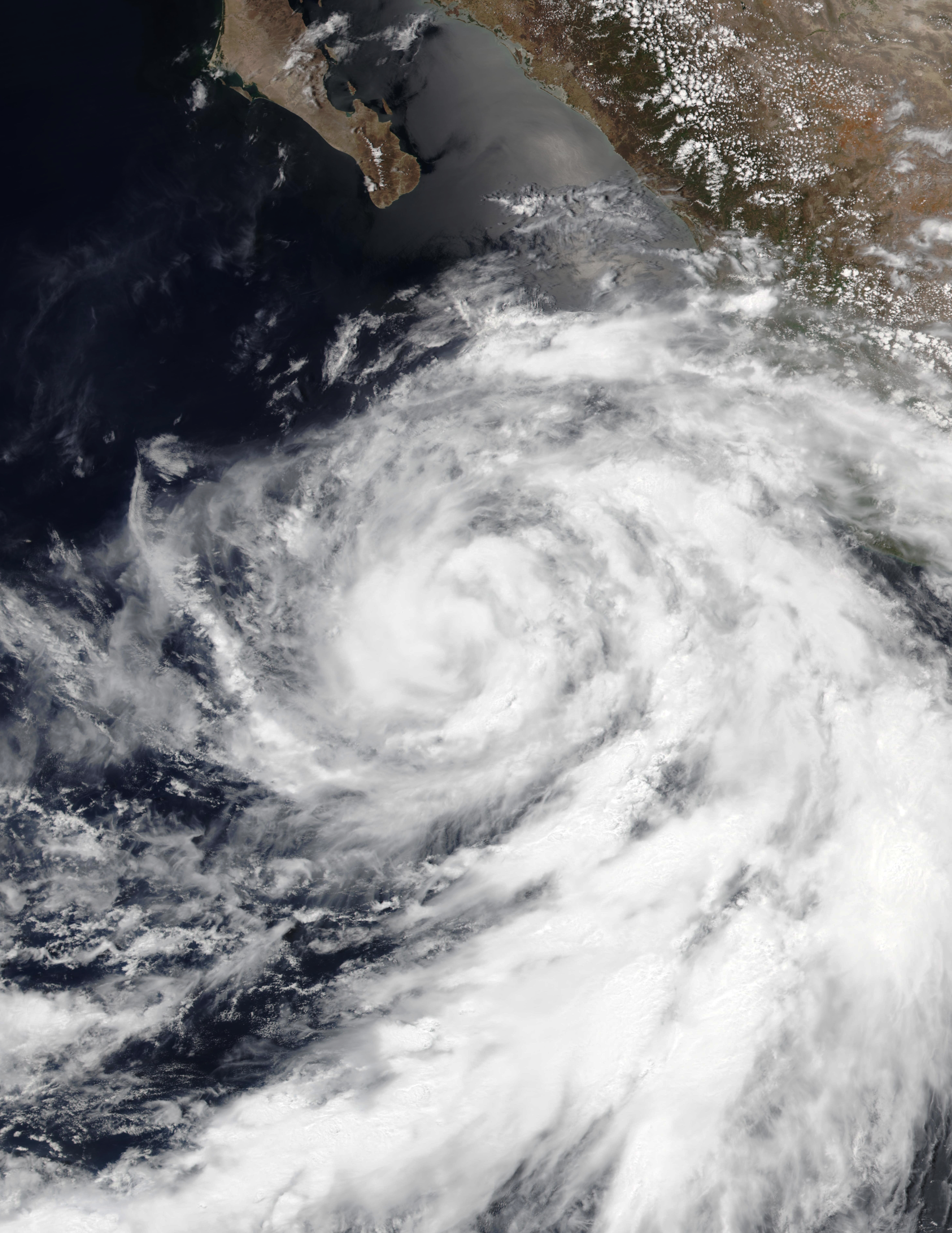
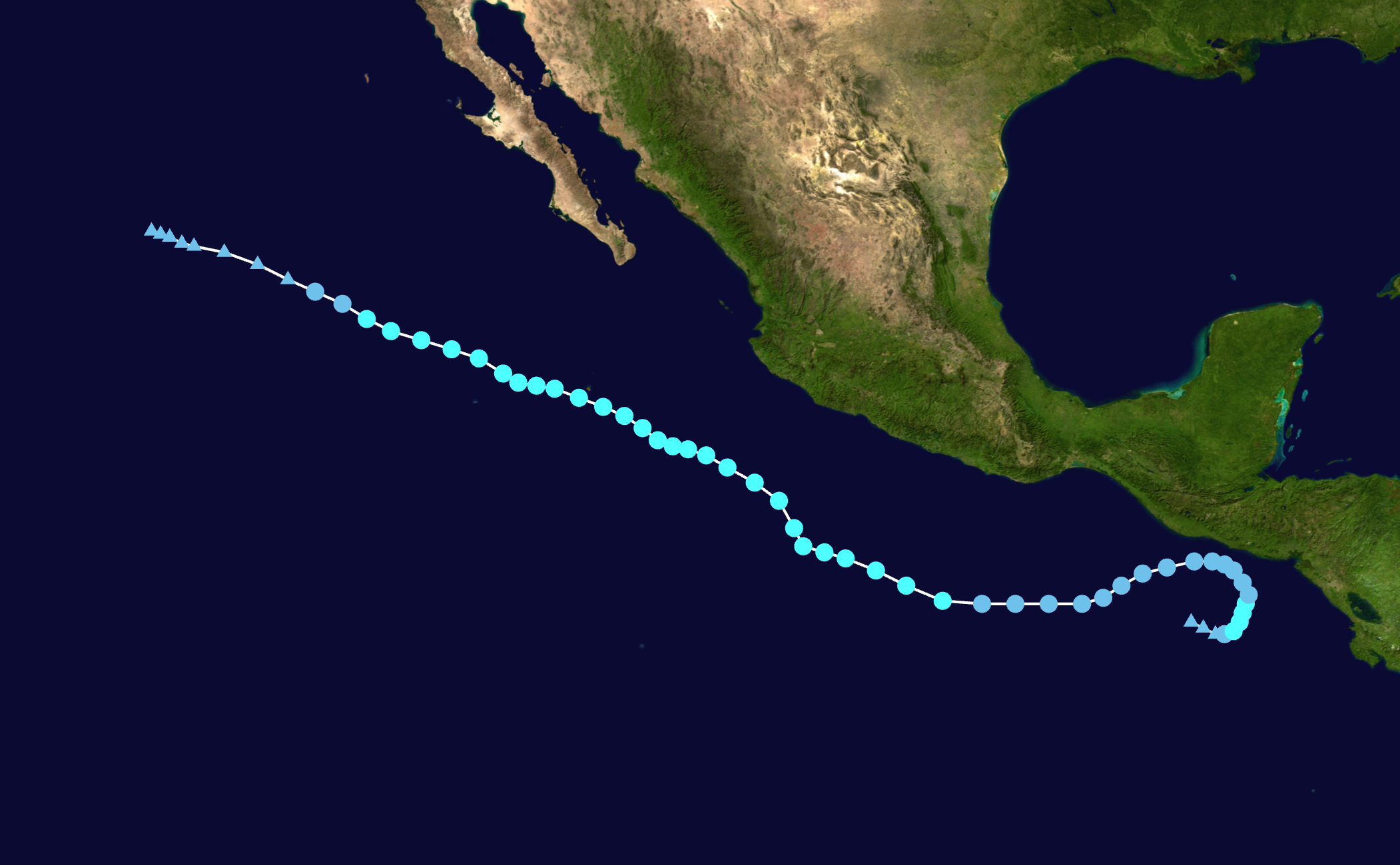
- Duration: June 16 – June 28
- Peak intensity: 60 mph (95 km/h) (1-min); 997 mbar (hPa)

A tropical wave departed Africa on June 5 and entered the East Pacific a week later, where it interacted with the active monsoon trough and the favorable phase of the Madden–Julian oscillation (MJO). Persistent thunderstorms spawned a broad area of low pressure, and both the low and associated convection organized over subsequent days. On June 16, the disturbance developed into a tropical depression; the next day, it intensified into Tropical Storm Celia. The new system moved unusually in its initial stages as it interacted with a cyclonic gyre established nearby, conducting a counter-clockwise curve before moving more definitively toward the west-northwest. Celia's intensity fluctuated for many days as it lost and regained convection in a moderate wind shear environment. On June 24, the cyclone reached peak winds of 60 mph (97 km/h) in spite of a sprawling, disorganized core structure. Celia soon entered colder waters and drier air, causing it to degenerate to a remnant low on June 28 after an unusually long stint as an early season tropical cyclone. The low finally dissipated well west of the Baja California peninsula on June 30.

While stalled off the coast of Central America, Celia interacted with a nearby low-pressure system which brought heavy rainfall to western Guatemala, affecting over 28,000 people. One death has been attributed to Celia. It occurred in Oaxaca, where a man drowned.

=== Hurricane Bonnie ===
- Category 3 hurricane (SSHWS)
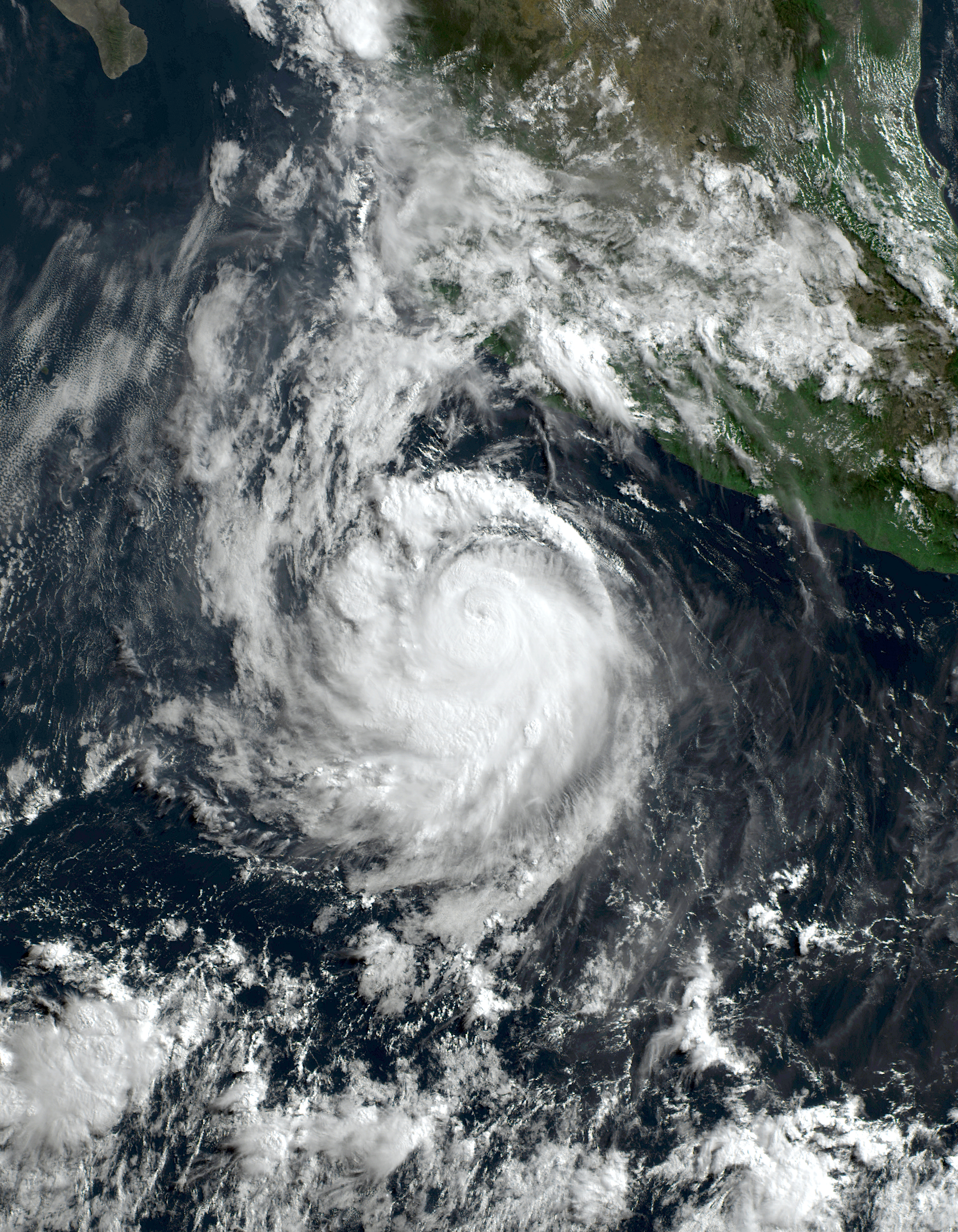
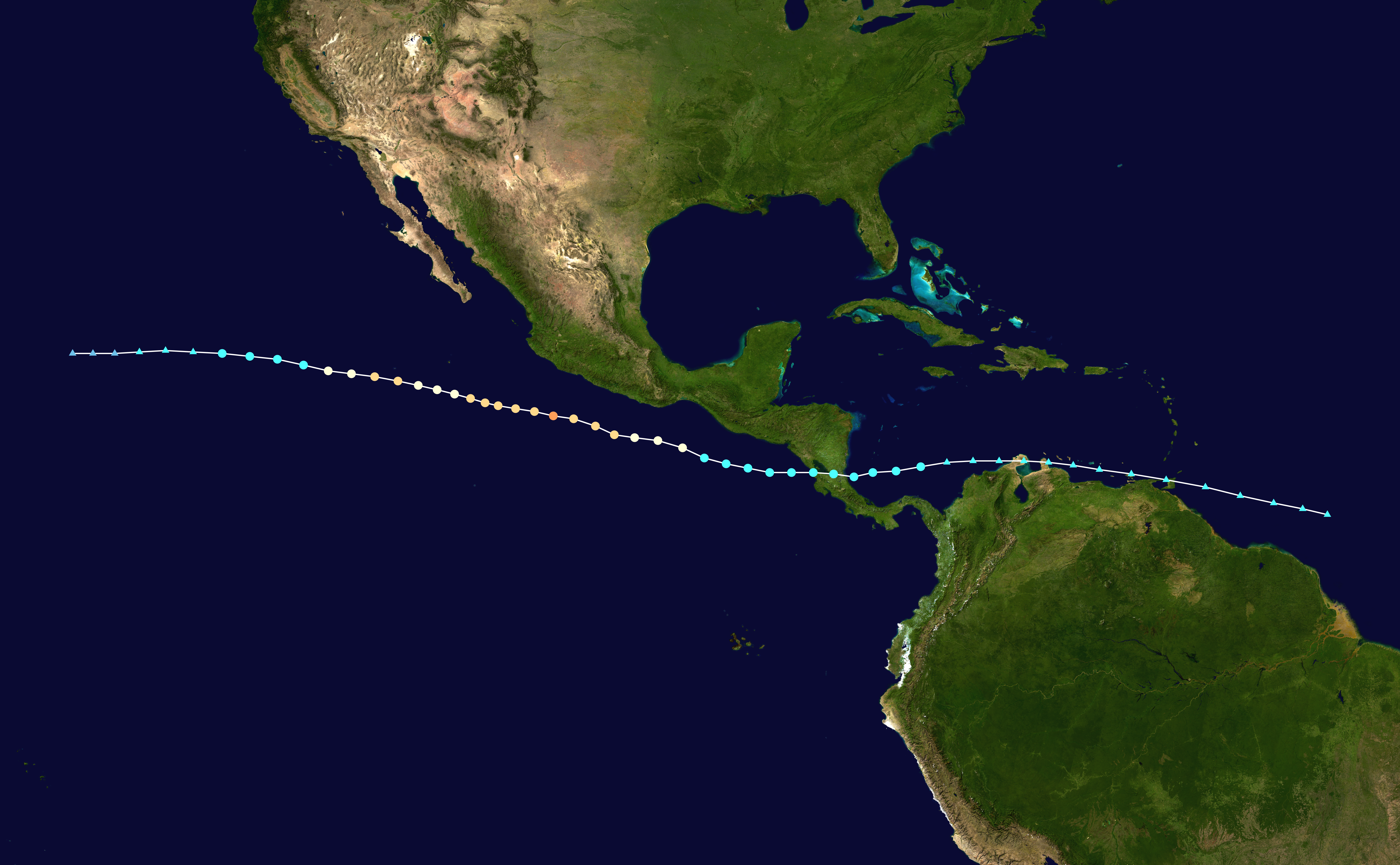
- Duration: July 2 (Entered basin) – July 9
- Peak intensity: 115 mph (185 km/h) (1-min); 964 mbar (hPa)

At around 15:00 UTC on July 2, Tropical Storm Bonnie emerged into the Eastern Pacific from the Atlantic basin after crossing Nicaragua. Bonnie steadily reorganized as it moved westward away from the coast. Satellite images from later on July 2, revealed the storm to have a deep convective curved band with −117 °F (−83 °C) cloud tops enveloping its west side. This strengthening trend continued, and by the end of the next day, the primary band had become wrapped completely around the center and an inner core was developing. At 03:00 UTC on July 4, Bonnie became a hurricane while located about 210 mi (340 km) south of Salina Cruz, Oaxaca, and attained Category 2 strength later that same day. By early on July 5, Bonnie's inner core structure had become well-developed with a 10 mi-wide (20 km) eye. As a result, the hurricane was able to reach Category 3 strength by 15:00 UTC that day. Beginning several hours afterward and continuing into July 6, Bonnie's cloud pattern deteriorated and the central convection became less organized due to moderate north-northeasterly shear, causing it to weaken to Category 2 strength. The system maintained wind speeds of around 105 mph (165 km/h) for much of that day as it moved west-northwestward away from the Mexican coast, before weakening to Category 1 strength with winds of 90 mph (150 km/h) on July 7. Bonnie's intensity continued to decrease the following day as it moved into cooler waters with sea surface temperatures of 75–77 °F (24–25 °C), where it weakened to a tropical storm about 825 mi (1,330 km) west-southwest of the southern tip of the Baja California peninsula. Then, on July 9, Bonnie degenerated into a post-tropical low as all deep convection within ceased.

=== Hurricane Darby ===
- Category 4 hurricane (SSHWS)
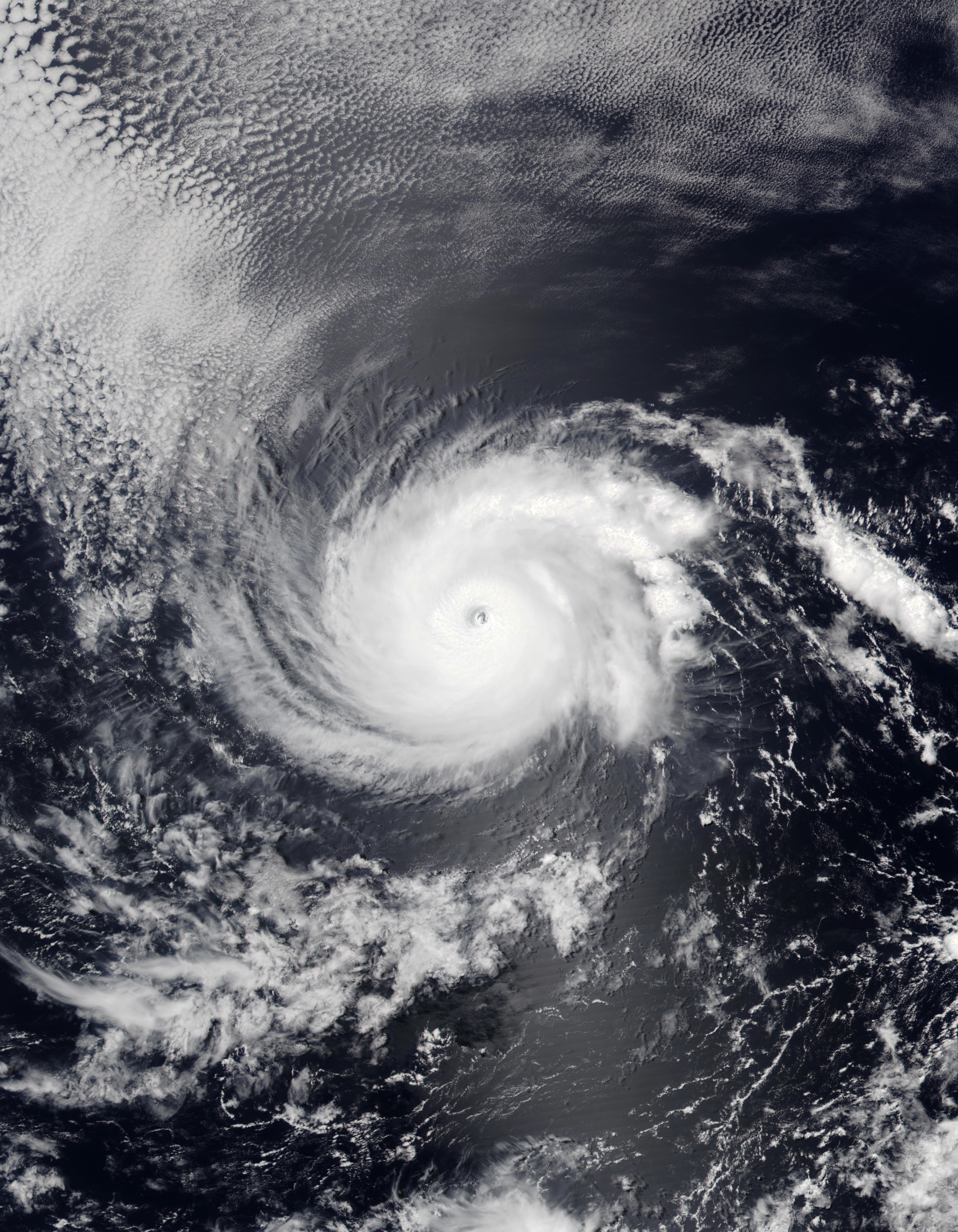
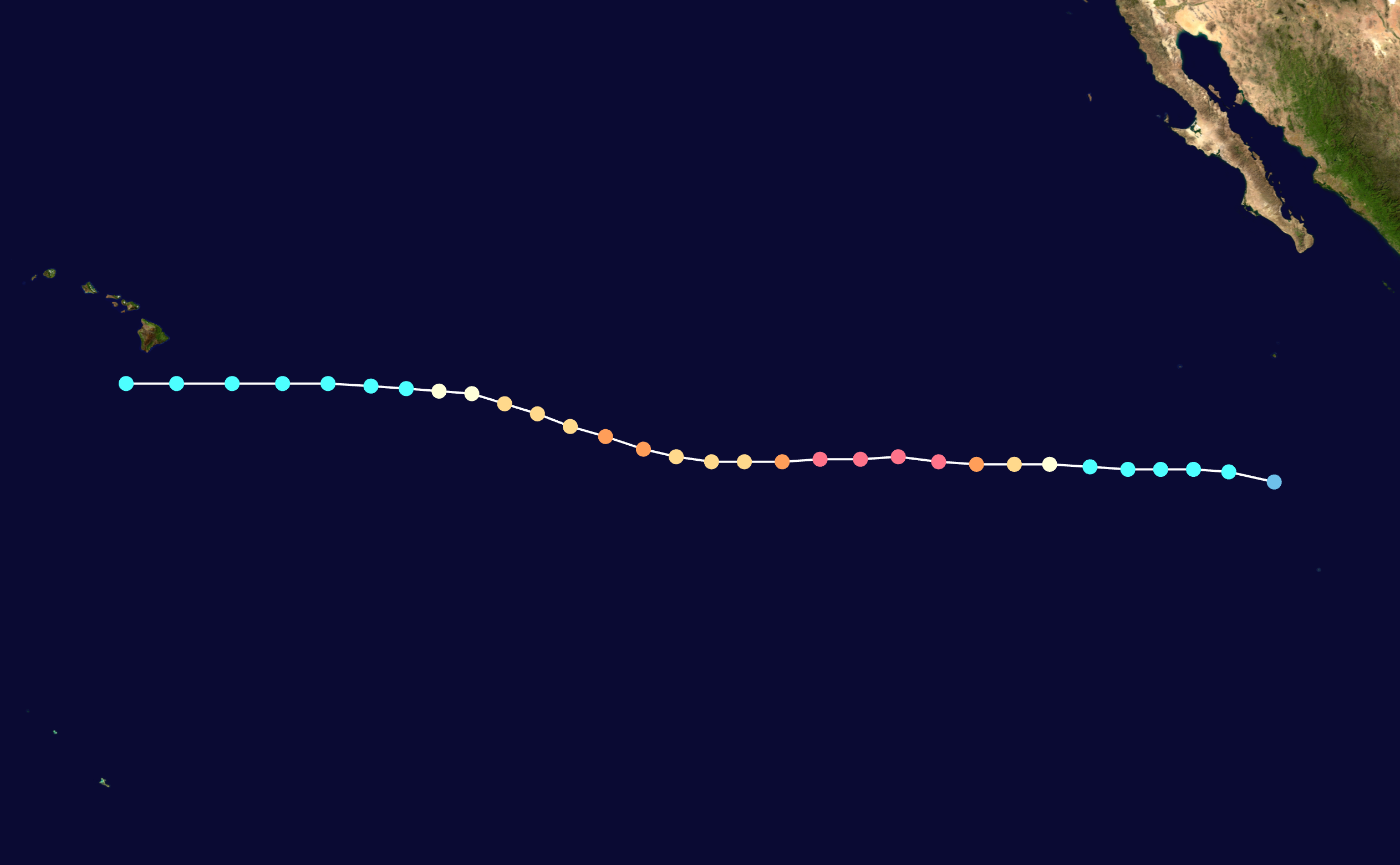
- Duration: July 9 – July 16
- Peak intensity: 140 mph (220 km/h) (1-min); 953 mbar (hPa)

A tropical wave emerged off Africa on June 26–27 and entered the East Pacific by July 6. The disturbance became gradually better organized as it moved west to west-northwest away from the Mexico coastline, becoming a tropical depression early on July 9 and intensifying into Tropical Storm Darby later that day. Dry air briefly interrupted the storm's intensification, but Darby quickly rebounded and rapidly intensified into a hurricane on July 11. In a 24-hour period ending at 00:00 UTC on July 12, the cyclone strengthened from a 75 mph (121 km/h) hurricane to a 140 mph (230 km/h) Category 4 cyclone, its peak intensity. The storm displayed characteristics of an annular hurricane and was exceptionally small, with hurricane-force winds only extending about 10 mi (16 km) from the center. The system fluctuated in intensity until it encountered a more hostile environment in the Central Pacific basin. The combination of strong wind shear and colder waters caused Darby to dissipate into a trough on July 16 while located southwest of Hawaii's Big Island.

Darby brought 1–3 in of rain and 8–12 ft waves to the big island of Hawaii. However, there were no reports of significant damages from the storm.

=== Hurricane Estelle ===
- Category 1 hurricane (SSHWS)
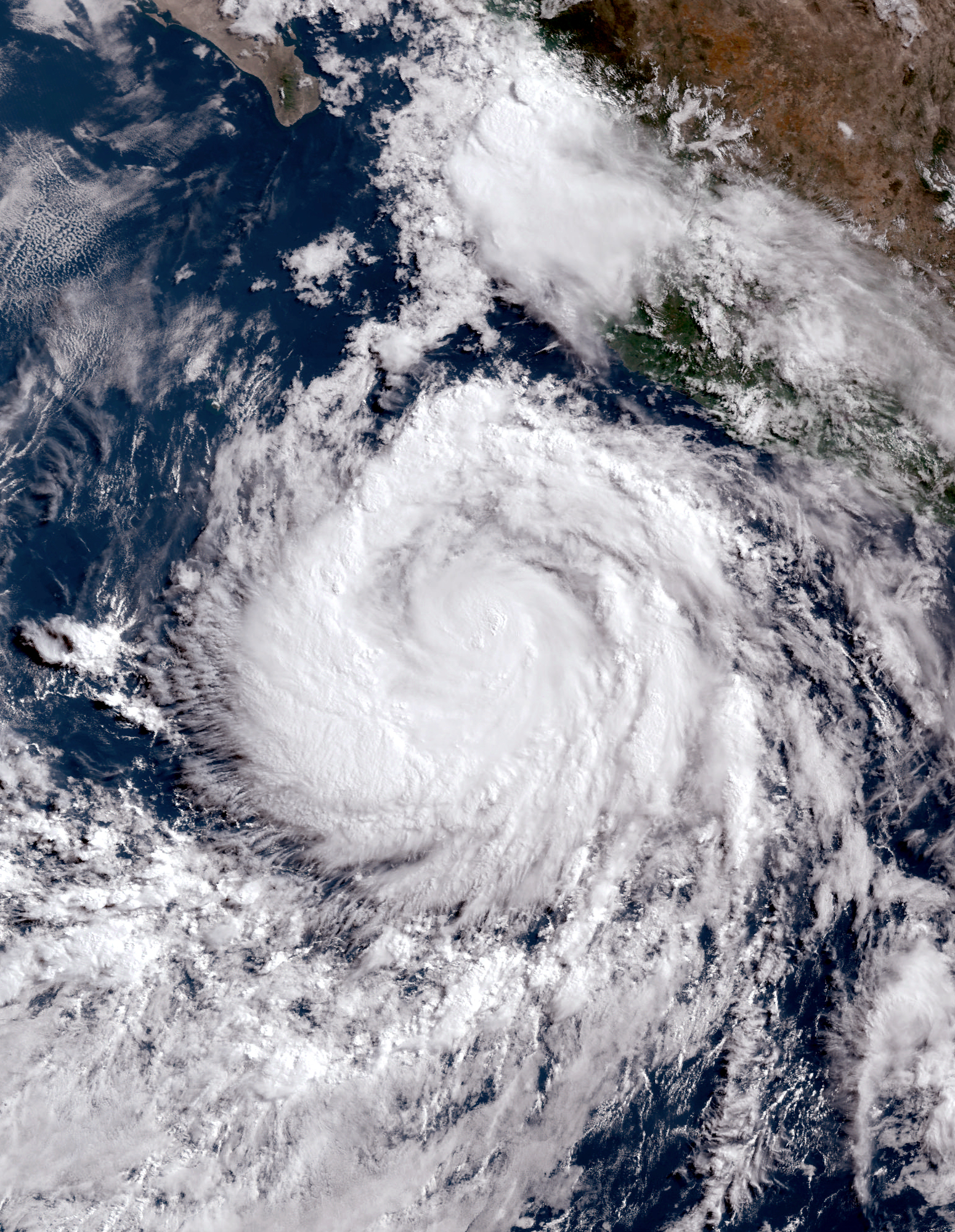
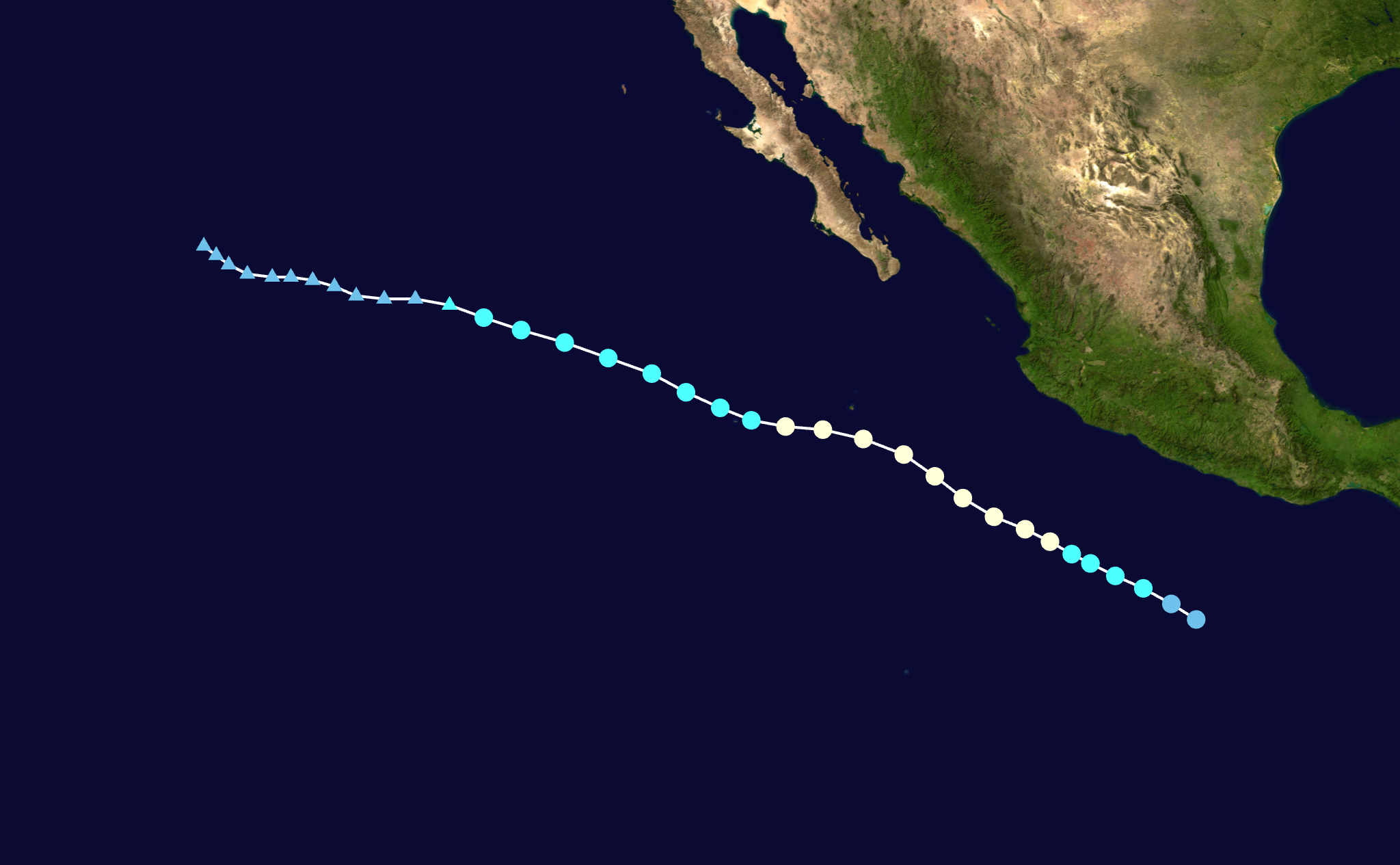
- Duration: July 15 – July 21
- Peak intensity: 85 mph (140 km/h) (1-min); 985 mbar (hPa)

On July 7, the NHC began monitoring the southeastern Pacific south of the coast of Central America, where a low pressure area was expected to form within a few days. The anticipated disturbance formed on July 11, far south of the coasts of Guatemala and El Salvador, producing some disorganized showers. By July 15, the disturbance had become sufficiently organized to be classified as a tropical depression by the NHC. By 03:00 UTC on July 16, the depression had strengthened, with a well defined low-level structure and a tight band of persistent deep convection near the center, and was upgraded to Tropical Storm Estelle. Then, after being hindered by northeasterly shear later that same day, intense convection was able to wrapped completely around the center and Estelle rapidly intensified into a hurricane by 03:00 UTC on July 17. Twelve hours later, the sustained winds near the system's center were at 85 mph (135 km/h). It became weaker, however, as the day went on, apparently due to the inflow of dry air into its core and the effects of wind shear, and its winds fell to 80 mph (130 km/h) by day's end. The gradual weakening continued, and at 09:00 UTC on July 19, Estelle was downgraded to a tropical storm when its center was located just north of Clarion Island. Estelle's upper-level cloud shield became more symmetric later that day, due to reduced wind shear and increased convection that had wrapped around the storm's northern region. By 15:00 UTC on July 21, however, the storm had weakened to a tropical depression as it moved west-northwestward over the open ocean. Later that day the system became a remnant low.

Though Estelle remained well off shore, heavy rains were reported in coastal areas of Baja California Sur, Jalisco, Nayarit and Sinaloa, causing localized flooding and landslides.

=== Hurricane Frank ===
- Category 1 hurricane (SSHWS)
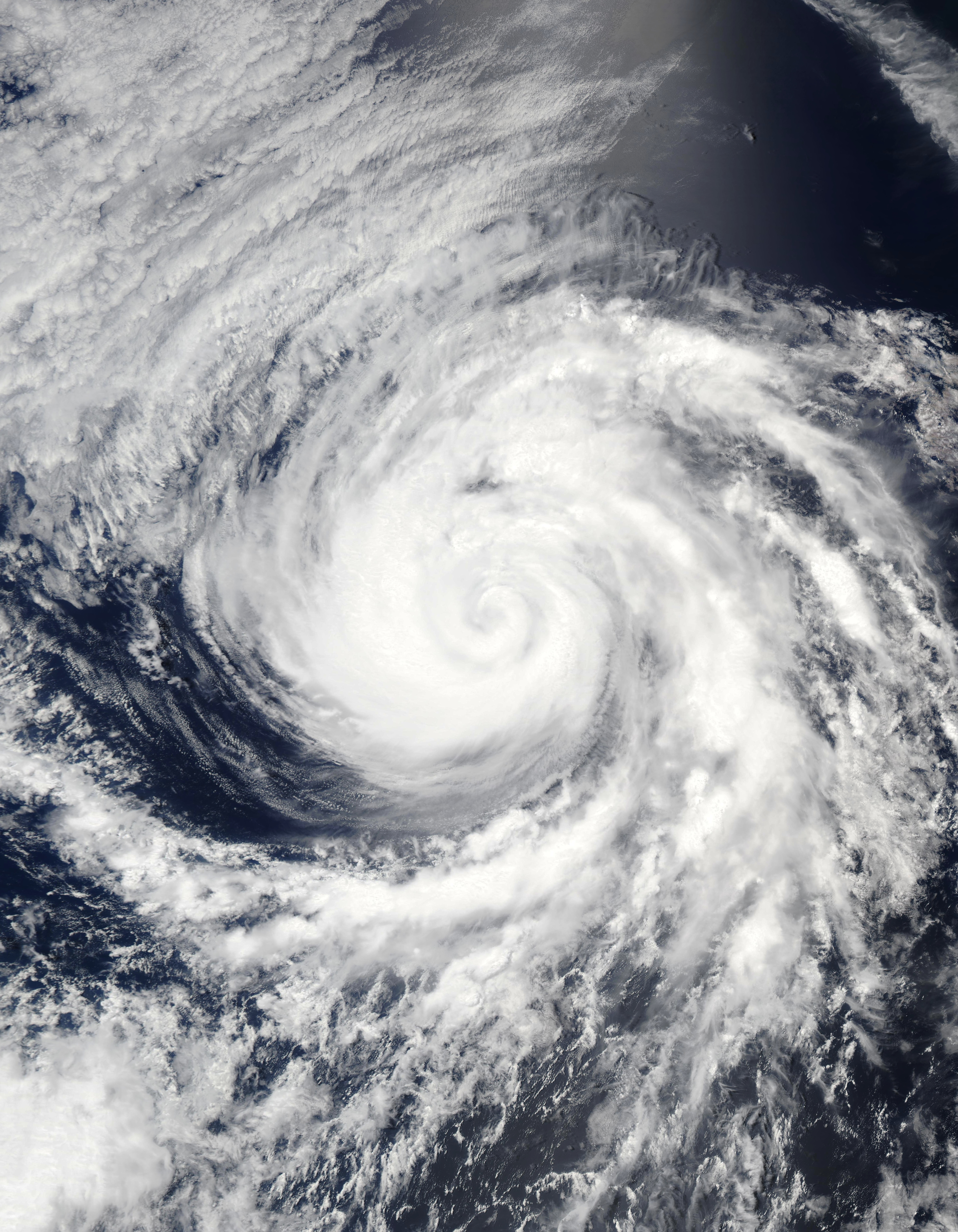
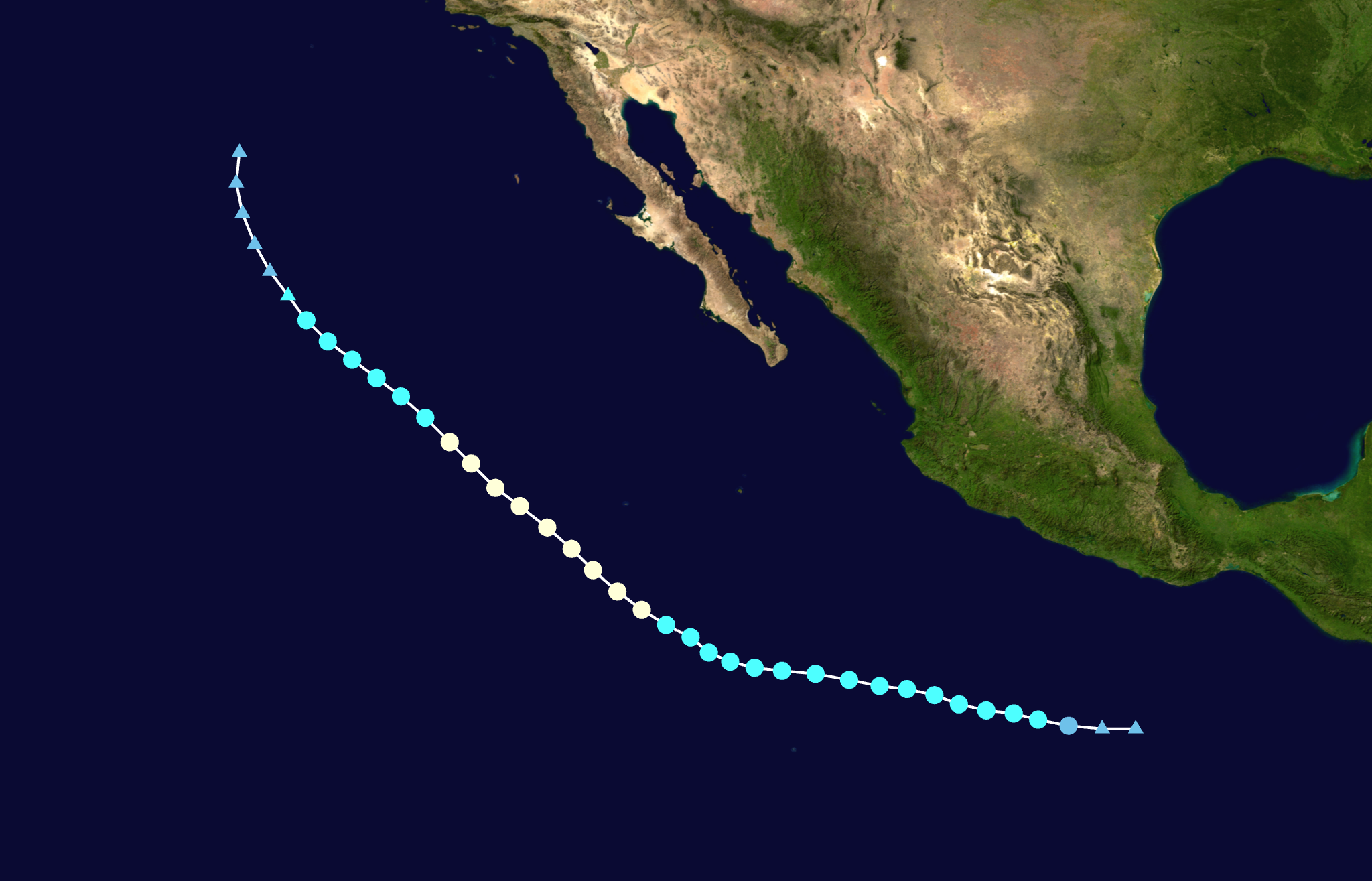
- Duration: July 26 – August 2
- Peak intensity: 90 mph (150 km/h) (1-min); 976 mbar (hPa)

On July 21, the NHC began forecasting that an area of low pressure would develop off the southern coasts of El Salvador and Guatemala within a few days. An area of low pressure, associated with a tropical wave, developed two days later, producing disorganized showers and thunderstorms. At 09:00 UTC on July 26, after deep convection developed at the center of the disturbance and become better organized, it was designated as a tropical depression. Six hours later, the system strengthened into Tropical Storm Frank while located about 525 mi (845 km) south-southeast of Manzanillo, Colima. Convection near the storm's center struggled to organize due to northeasterly wind shear as the storm moved westward. The shear persisted through early on July 28. Once the shear diminished sufficiently, the storm was able to strengthen, with deep convection becoming more symmetric around the center and banding features becoming well established by late the next day. Frank consequently intensified into a hurricane by 03:00 UTC on July 30. The system moved to the northwest during the day and maintained sustained winds of 90 mph (150 km/h) for several hours, before encountering decreasing sea surface temperatures by day's end. It then began to weaken as a result, and fell to tropical storm strength early on August 1. Later, it ceased producing organized deep convection and degenerated into a post-tropical cyclone during the following day.

=== Tropical Storm Georgette ===
- Tropical storm (SSHWS)
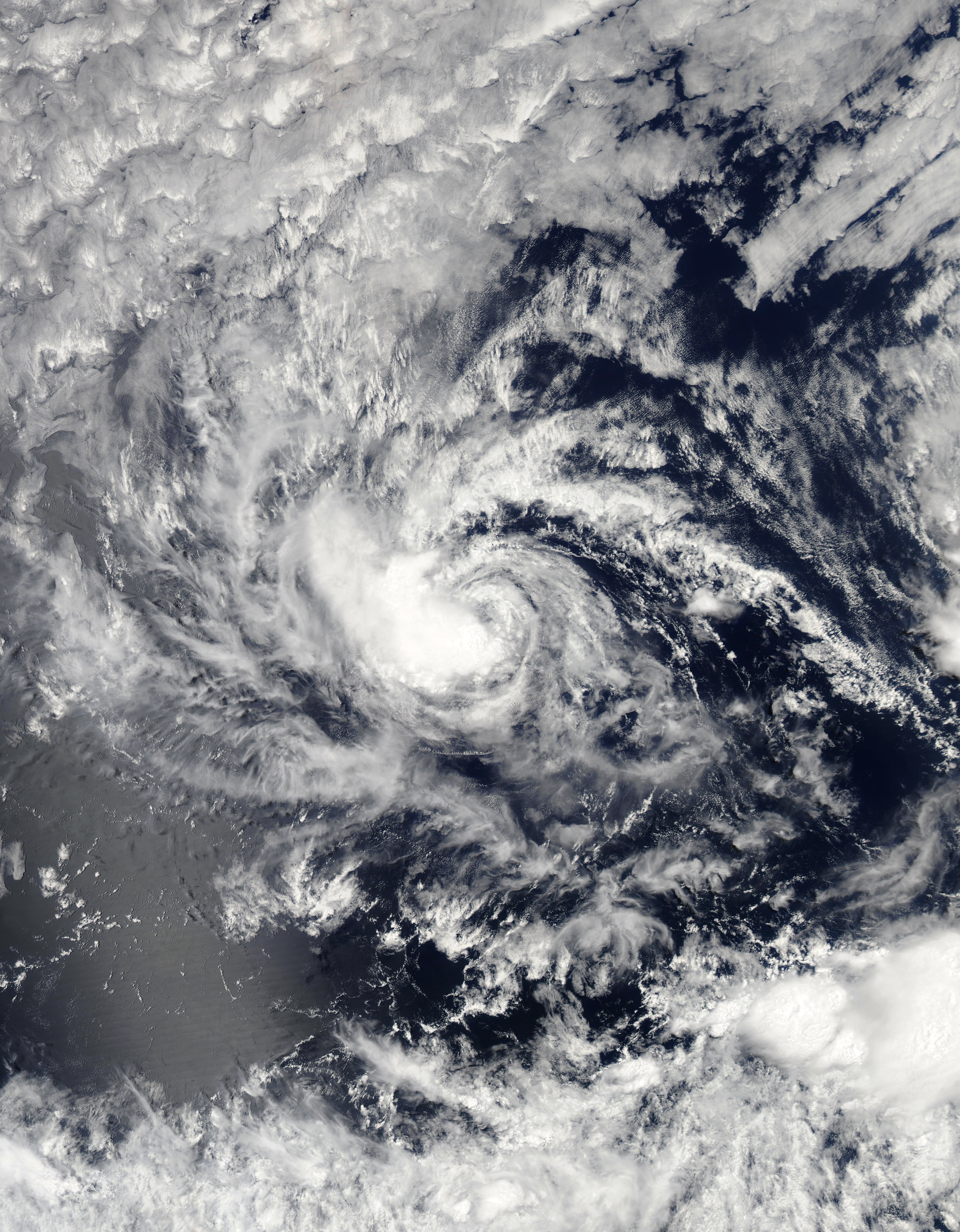
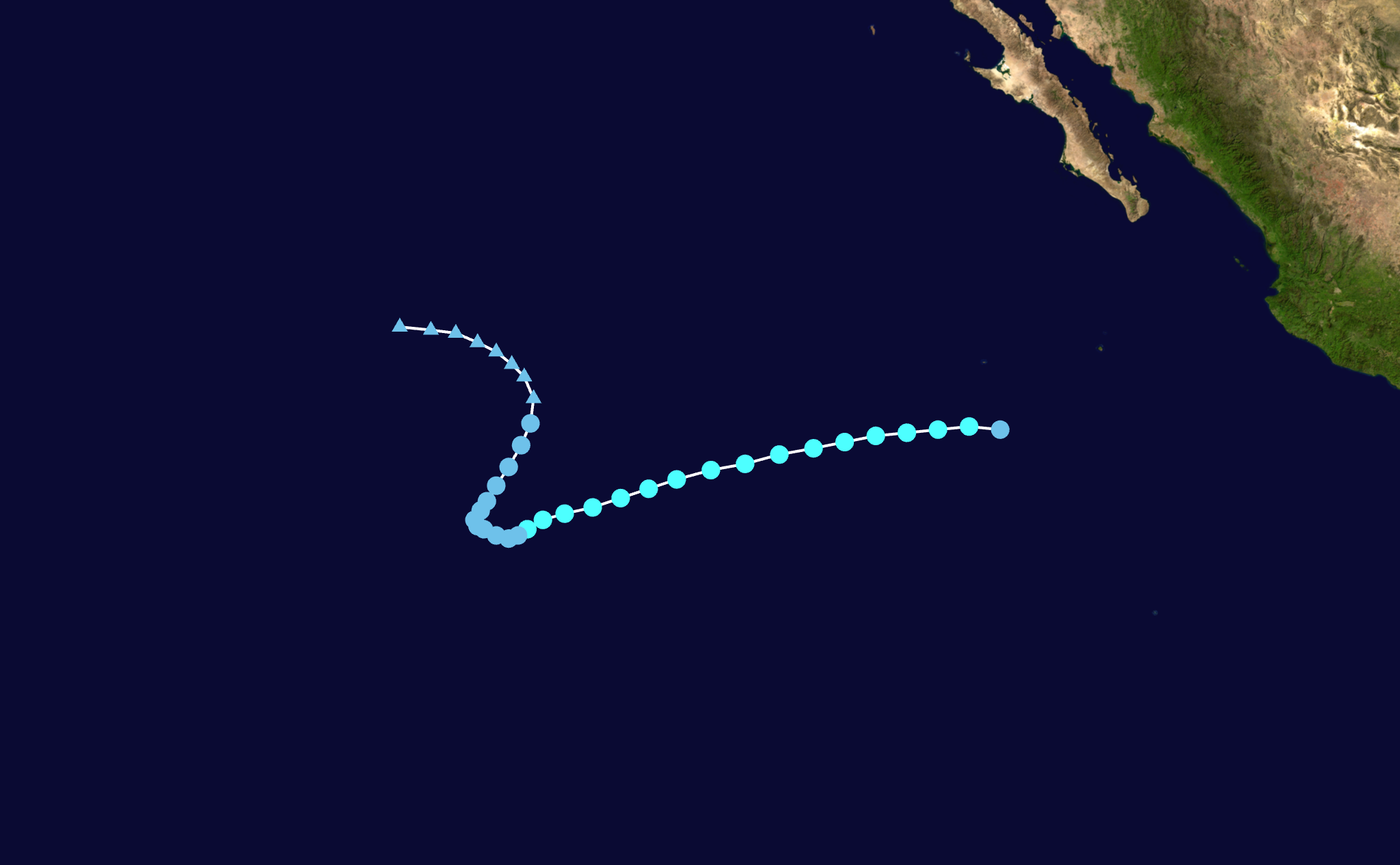
- Duration: July 27 – August 3
- Peak intensity: 60 mph (95 km/h) (1-min); 998 mbar (hPa)

On July 25, the NHC began monitoring an area of low pressure located southwest of the coast of southwestern Mexico for possible tropical development. The disturbance continued to become better organized and was designated as a tropical depression at 09:00 UTC on July 27. Six hours later, the depression strengthened into a compact Tropical Storm Georgette. The system remained relatively unchanged in strength during the next couple of days, though by early on July 29, its cloud pattern had become more symmetric with a well-developed rain band in the north part of the storm, and its sustained winds reached 60 mph (95 km/h). Then, moving slowly westward, the storm waned over the next couple days, due in part to strong easterly shear generated by the outflow from the circulation of Hurricane Frank, and weakened to a tropical depression on the afternoon of July 31. Further weakening occurred on August 1–2, as the depression made a northeastward turn, steered by Frank. Then, during the afternoon of August 3, Georgette degenerated into a remnant low over the open ocean.

=== Hurricane Howard ===
- Category 1 hurricane (SSHWS)
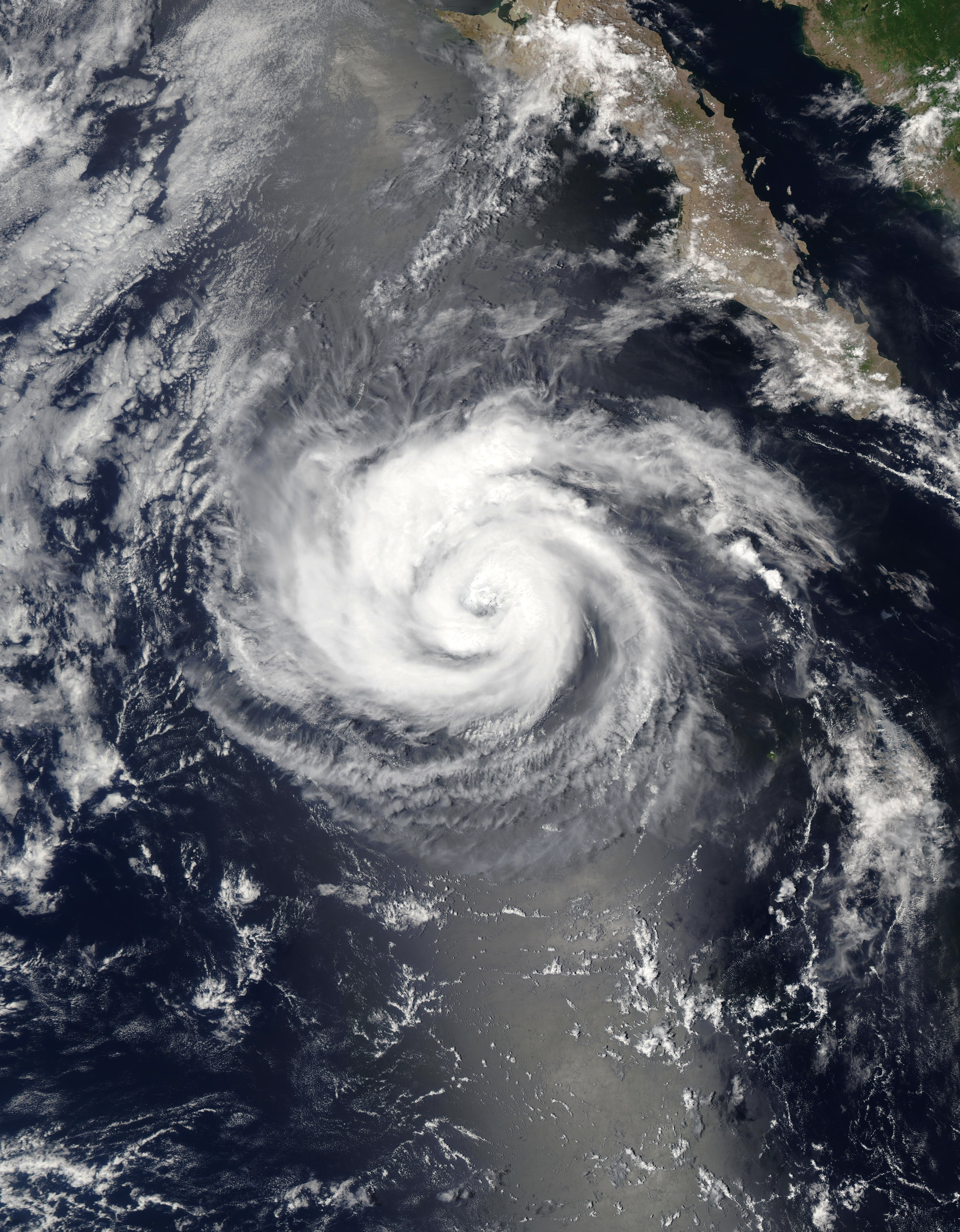
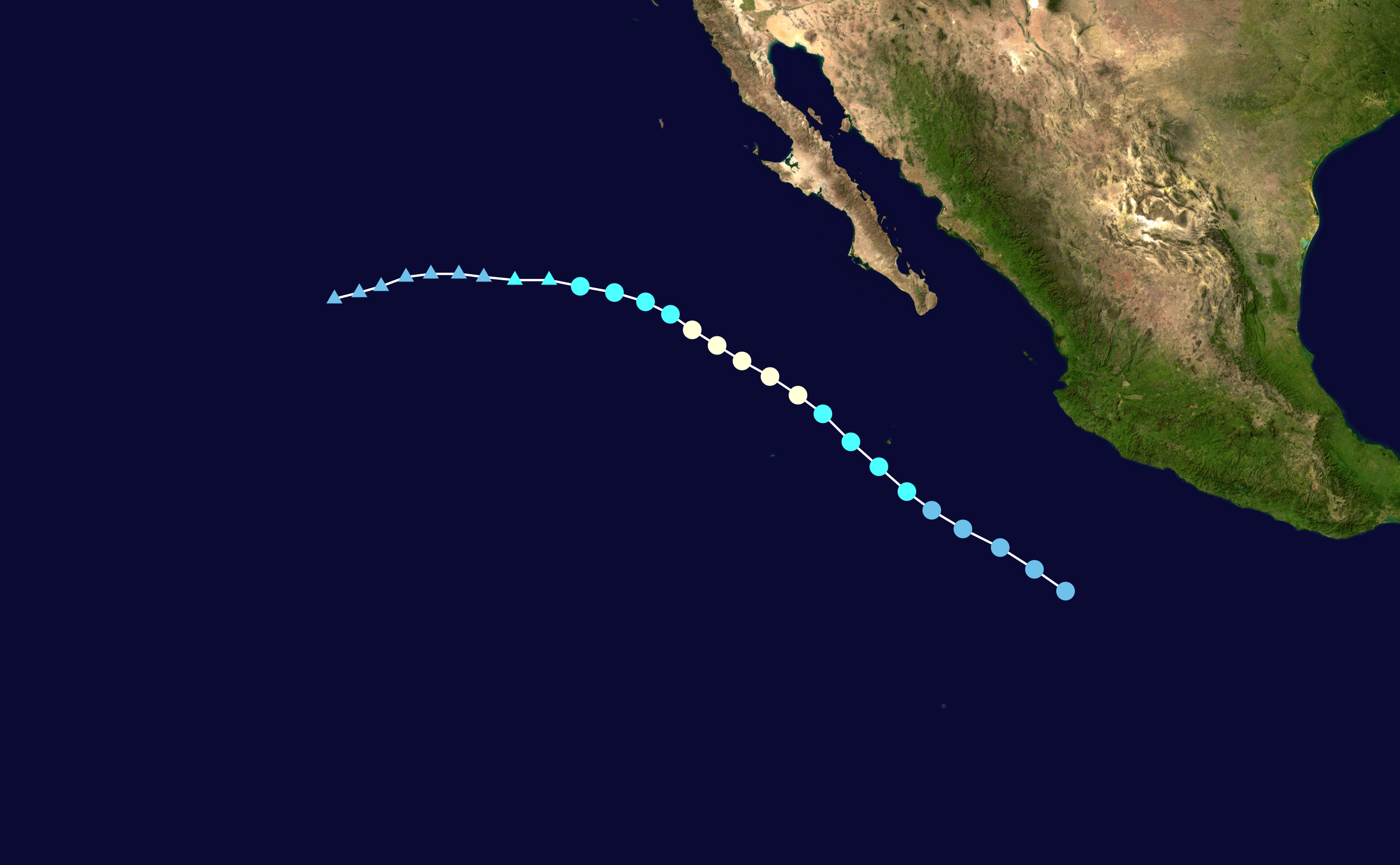
- Duration: August 6 – August 10
- Peak intensity: 85 mph (140 km/h) (1-min); 983 mbar (hPa)

On August 2, the NHC began monitoring a tropical wave producing widespread showers and thunderstorms over Central America and the adjacent waters in anticipation that an area of low pressure would form once it moved over the eastern Pacific. The anticipated low developed two days later off the coasts of Guatemala and southern Mexico. By August 6, the disturbance had become sufficiently organized to be classified as a tropical depression by the NHC. Beset by dry air imported to the depression's center by moderate wind shear, the depression was unable to quickly intensify. On the afternoon of August 7, the depression was upgraded to Tropical Storm Howard as convection began to build over the northern semicircle of the system, though the low-level circulation remained partially exposed to the south due to continuing wind shear. The storm continued to organize into the following day, and became a Category 1 hurricane at 21:00 UTC on August 8, as an eye surrounded by deepening convective banding formed. On August 9, Howard's sustained winds reached 85 mph (140 km/h) as it moved west-northwestward, before weakening to a tropical storm at 03:00 UTC on August 10. The remaining deep convection near Howard's center ceased by the middle of that same day, and the storm later degenerated into a post-tropical low.

Sustained tropical storm-force winds of 40 mph (65 km/h), with higher gusts, were reported on Socorro Island around 00:00 UTC on August 8, as Howard passed nearby. That same day, the port of Mazatlán was closed to smaller vessels due to large waves. No coastal watches or warnings were issued for the storm.

=== Tropical Storm Ivette ===
- Tropical storm (SSHWS)
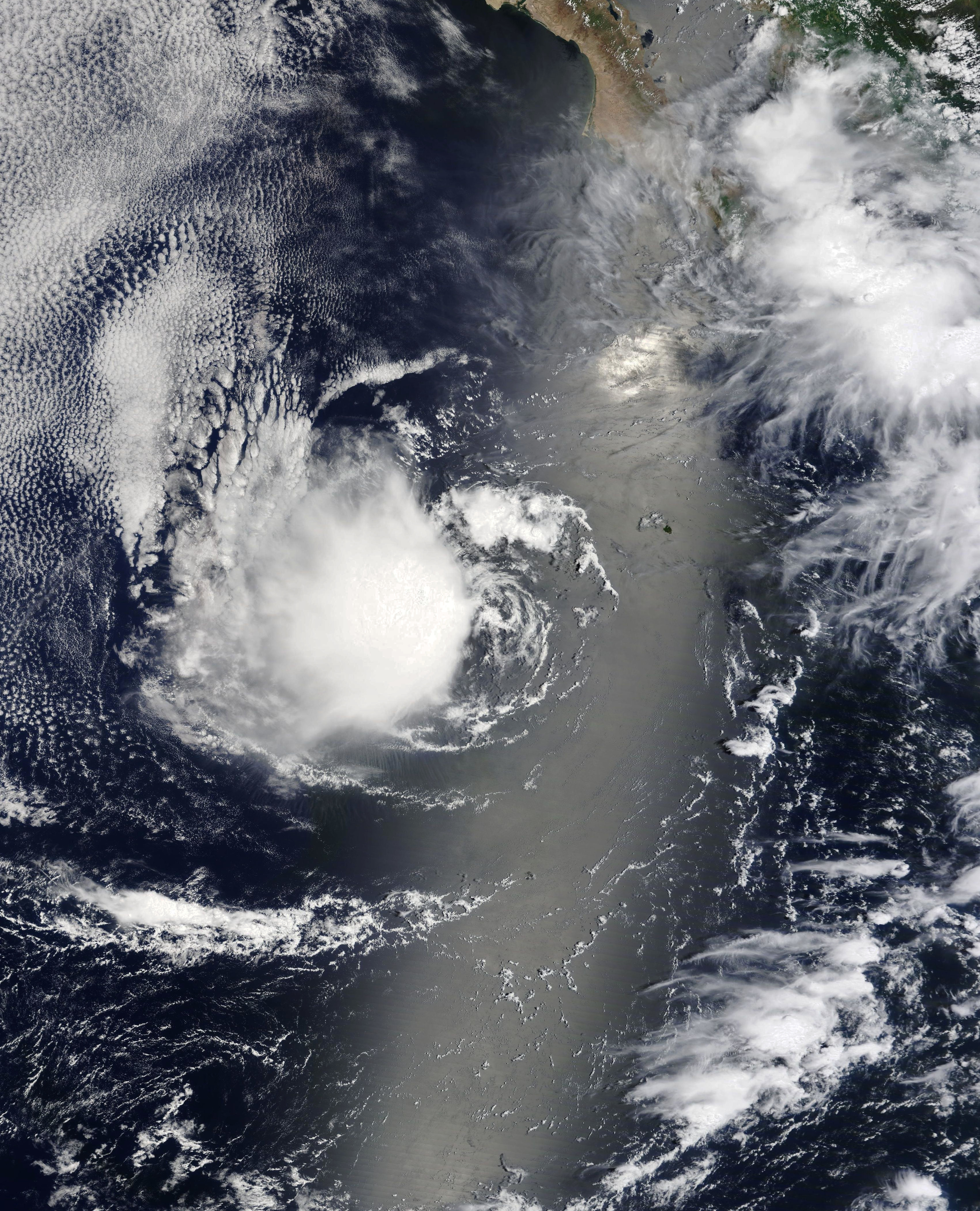
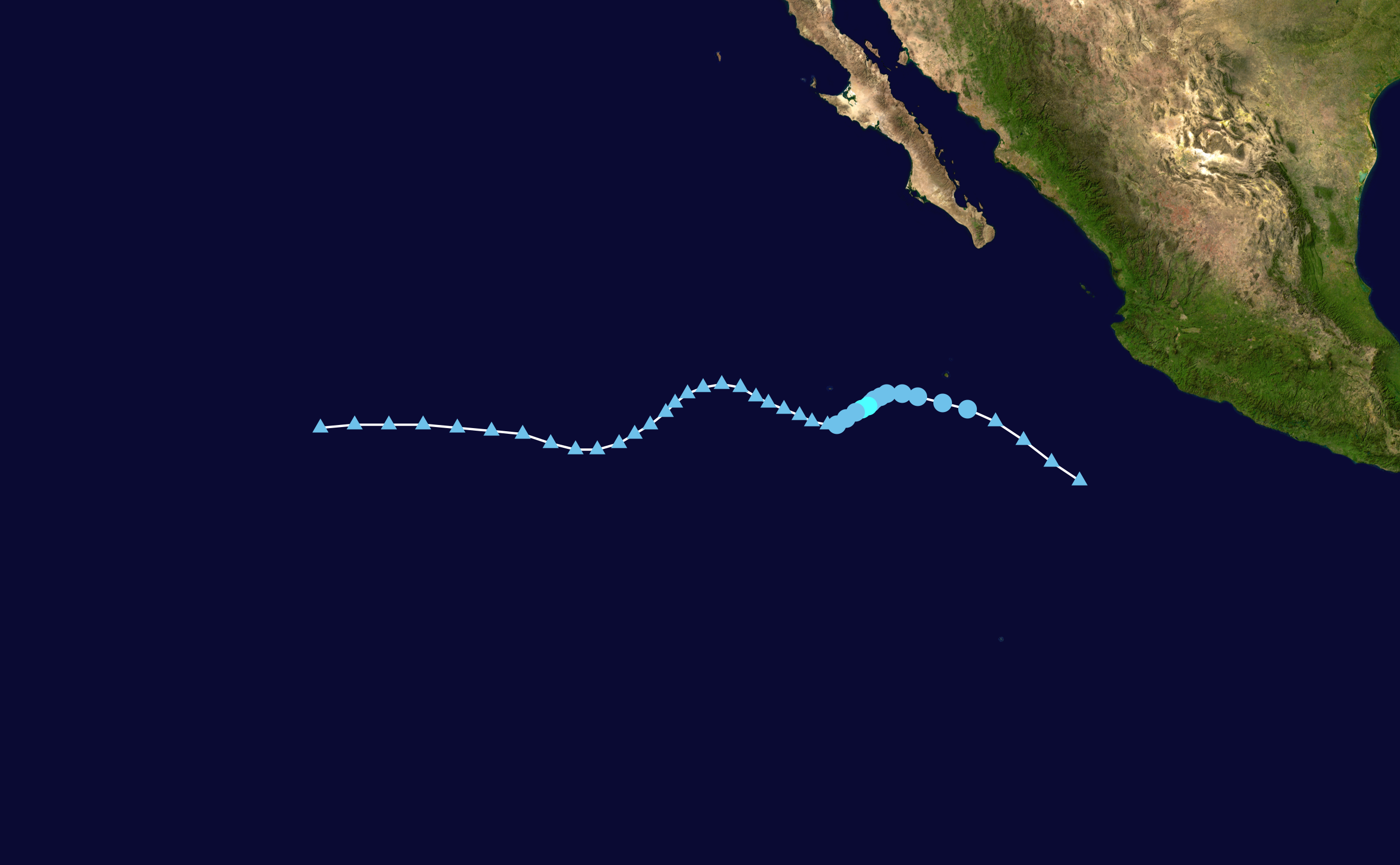
- Duration: August 13 – August 16
- Peak intensity: 40 mph (65 km/h) (1-min); 1005 mbar (hPa)

On August 7, the NHC began forecasting that an area of low pressure with a potential for tropical cyclogenesis would develop within a few days off the southwestern coast of Mexico. The low developed late the next day, producing disorganized showers and thunderstorms. It gradually become better defined, and on the afternoon of August 13, was classified as a tropical depression. It tracked over warm ocean waters, but there was little improvement in its structure due to moderate to strong east-northeasterly shear, until an unexpected burst of convection during the afternoon of August 15 resulted in the intensification of the depression into Tropical Storm Ivette. But within a few hours however, that burst was shearing away to the west and Ivette soon weakened back to a tropical depression. The system then degenerated into a remnant low on August 16.

=== Tropical Storm Javier ===
- Tropical storm (SSHWS)
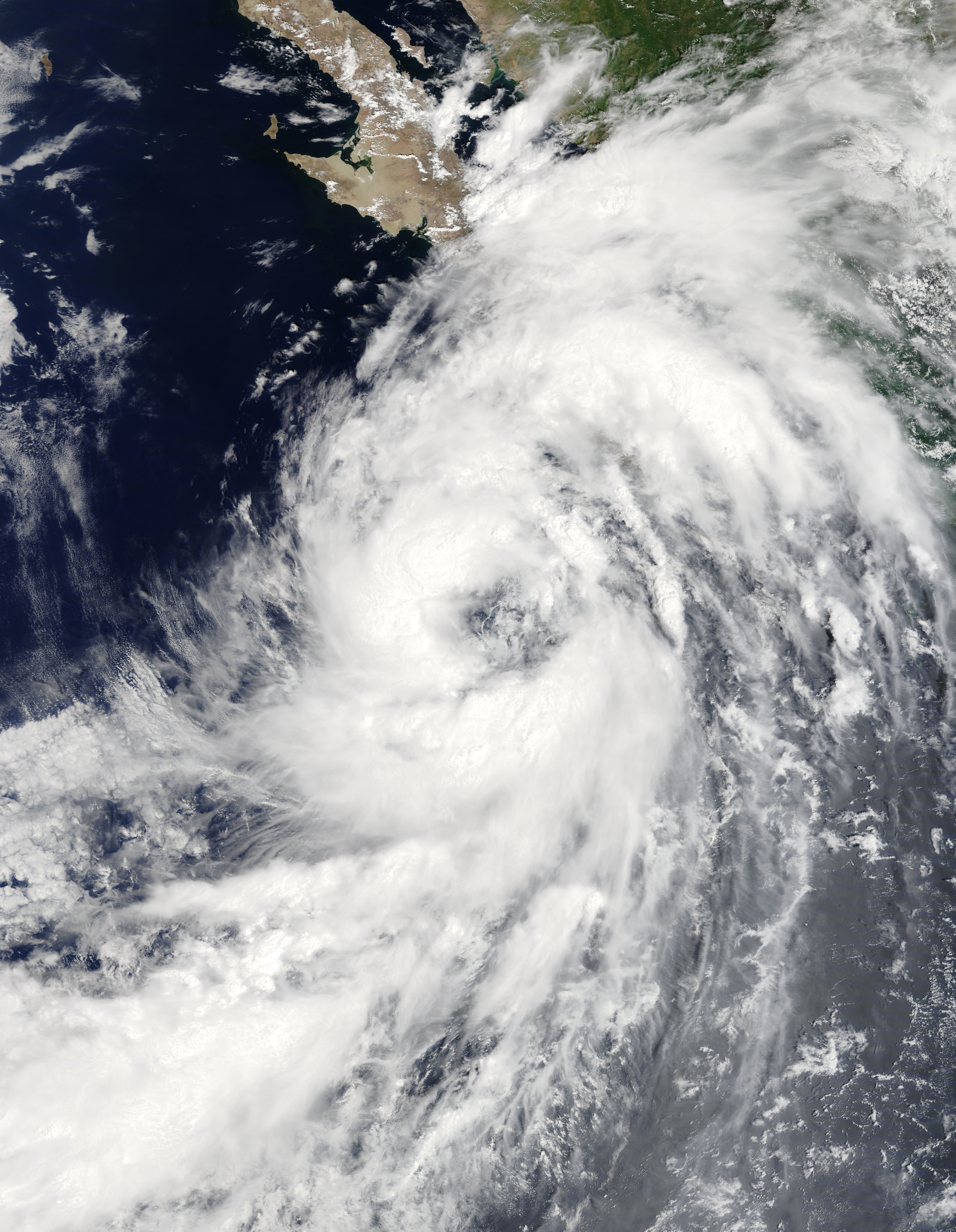
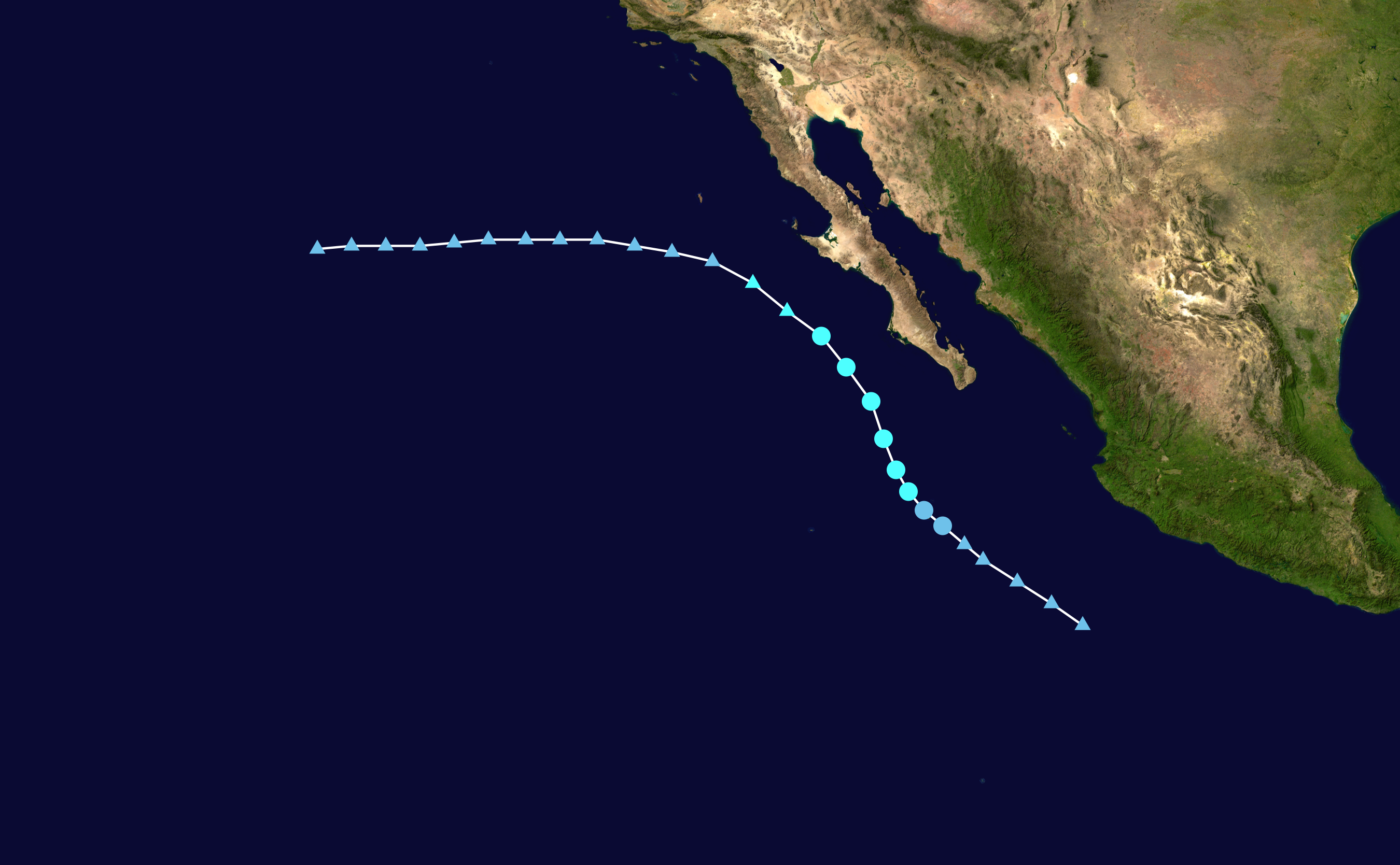
- Duration: September 1 – September 3
- Peak intensity: 50 mph (85 km/h) (1-min); 999 mbar (hPa)

On August 29, the NHC noted that an area of disturbed weather had formed a few hundred miles south of Acapulco, Mexico. The low gradually organized, developing a low-level circulation on August 31. By 18:00 UTC on September 1, it had gained enough organization to be classified as a tropical depression, while situated about 30 mi (45 km) east-southeast of Socorro Island. Then, fueled by increasing deep convection over the depression's western region and near its center, the system strengthened into Tropical Storm Javier early the next day, though its circulation remained somewhat elongated. Despite that, Javier intensified some, attaining sustained winds of 50 mph (85 km/h) on September 3. Later that same day however, the storm crossed over cooler waters and began to weaken. Javier became a post-tropical cyclone on September 4, while moving out to sea.

Rainbands of Javier brought heavy rain and wind gusts to the southern Baja California peninsula as it passed offshore. A total of 207 people were affected. 50 homes and a health center were damaged. Damages totaled to Mex$117 million (US$5.81 million).

=== Hurricane Kay ===
- Category 2 hurricane (SSHWS)
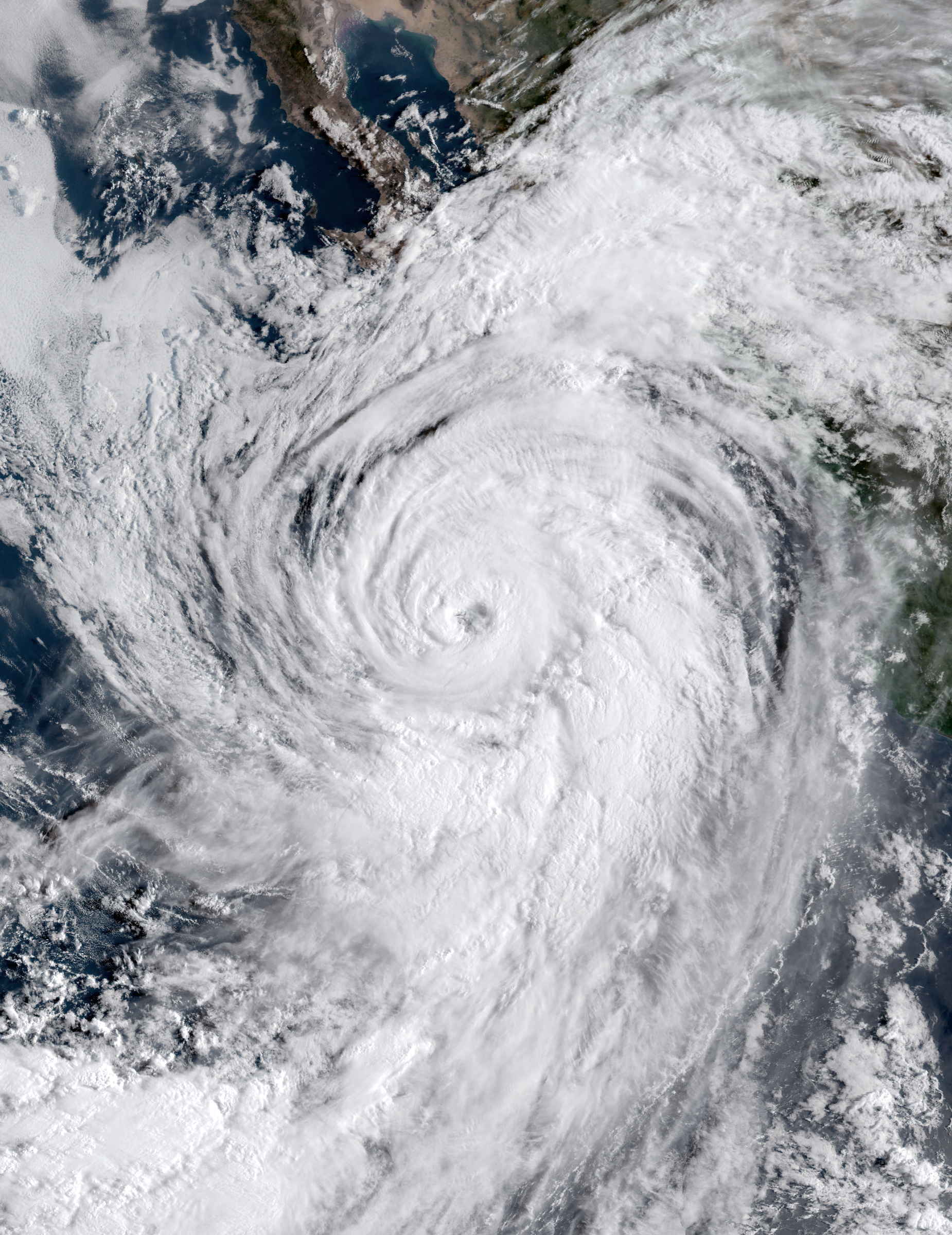
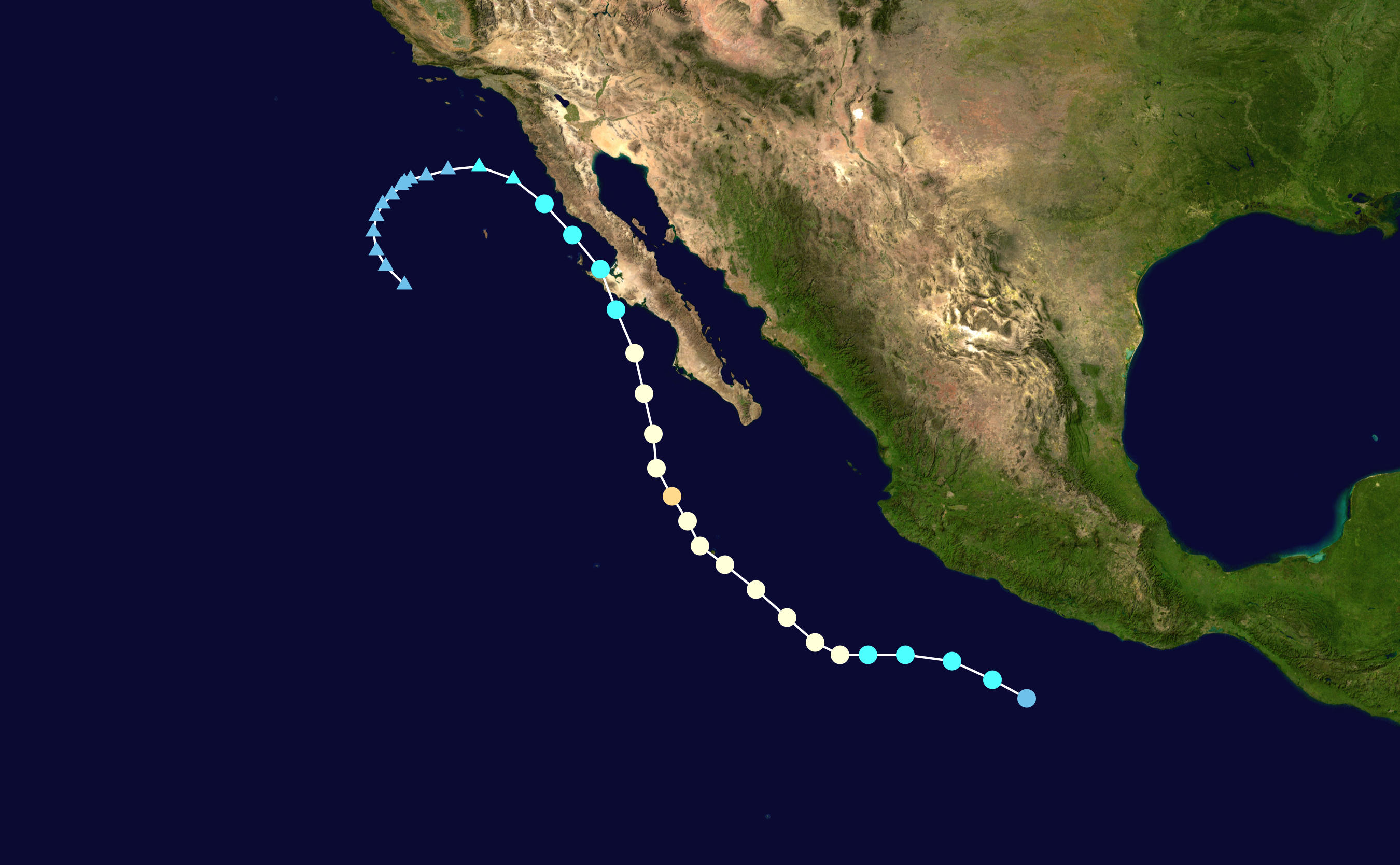
- Duration: September 4 – September 9
- Peak intensity: 100 mph (155 km/h) (1-min); 968 mbar (hPa)

On August 30, the NHC noted that an area of disturbed weather had formed a few hundred miles south of Acapulco, Guerrero. This disturbance became organized as a tropical depression on September 4, and strengthened into Tropical Storm Kay later that same day. The storm continued to intensify, and on the morning of September 5, became a Category 1 hurricane. On the following day, the eye of the hurricane passed over Socorro Island with sustained winds of 85 mph (140 km/h). Then, while moving north-northwestward early on September 7, Kay intensified into a Category 2 hurricane. This intensification proved short-lived however, as the cloud tops surrounding Kay's eye warmed and its overall cloud pattern became less organized and somewhat elongated later that same day, resulting in the hurricane weakening to Category 1 strength. Kay made landfall along the central Baja California peninsula coast with 70 mph (115 km/h) winds on September 8, then continuing to weaken as it moved back over the ocean. The storm became a post-tropical cyclone about 145 mi (233 km) southwest of San Diego, California, overnight September 9–10, while slowly curving further offshore.

Altogether, Kay was directly responsible for at least 4 deaths: 3 in Guerrero and 1 in California. Additionally, there were also 2 indirect deaths in Baja California Sur. As the system paralleled the coast of southwestern Mexico its rainbands drenched coastal states from Oaxaca north to Nayarit with up to 5.5 in (140 mm) of rain. Road and agricultural damage in Baja California Sur exceeded 72 million pesos (US$3.6 million). Kay's outer bands also hit Southern California and southwest Arizona, bringing wind gusts of near 100 mph (160 km/h) to some areas, primarily in San Diego County, California. Rainfall totals varied across the region, with Mt. Laguna, in San Diego County, recording the highest amount at 5.08 in (129 mm). Flash flooding closed numerous roads in both states; in Imperial County, California, falling boulders impeded traffic along a stretch of I-8. The rainfall was beneficial to crews in Riverside County, California, battling the Fairview Fire, as it mitigated some of the threat posed by the high winds and dry conditions.

=== Tropical Storm Lester ===
- Tropical storm (SSHWS)
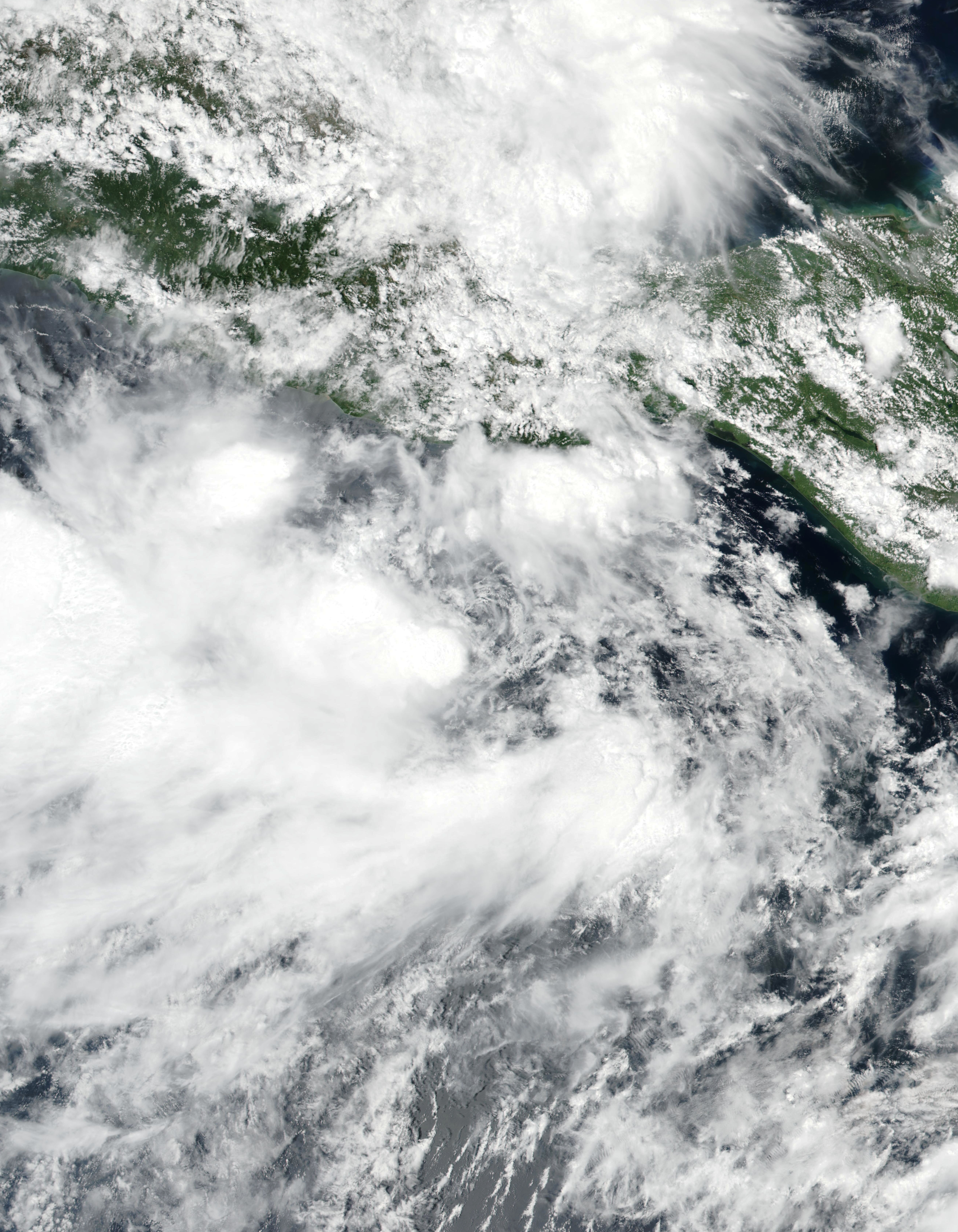
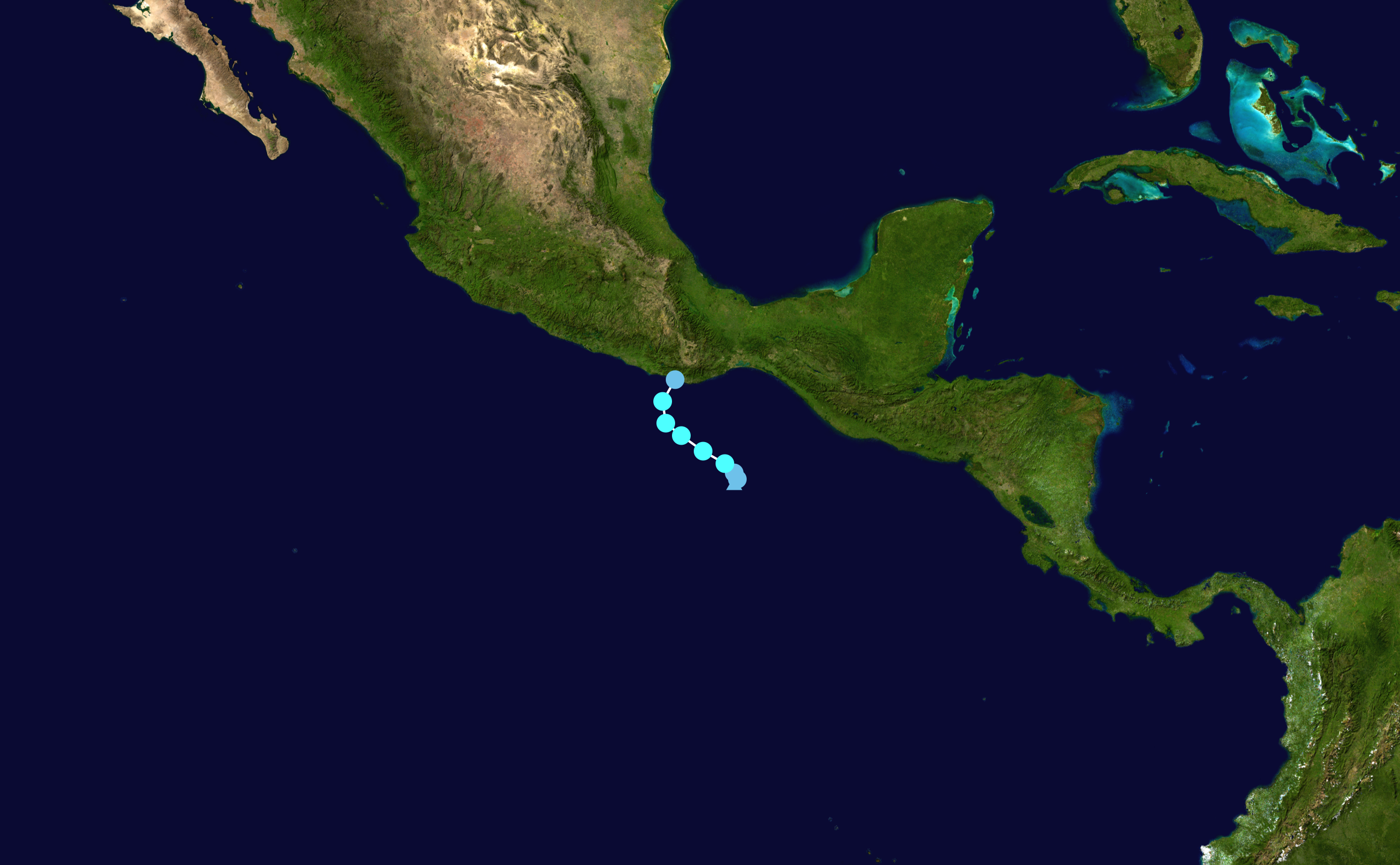
- Duration: September 15 – September 17
- Peak intensity: 40 mph (65 km/h) (1-min); 1005 mbar (hPa)

A trough of low pressure producing disorganized showers and thunderstorms extending from the Gulf of Tehuantepec westward to near the southern coast of Mexico formed on September 11. The low remained disorganized near the southern coast of Mexico for the next few days before showing initial signs of organization early on September 15. By 21:00 UTC that same day, the circulation around the center of the low had become better defined and a curved band of convection had formed over the western and southwestern areas of the circulation. In light of these developments the system was designated Tropical Depression Thirteen-E. Surface wind speeds in portions of the circulation increased overnight, and therefore the depression was upgraded to Tropical Storm Lester at 09:00 UTC on September 16, even though it still had a sheared appearance. The storm became somewhat better organized late that day, but this improvement proved fleeting, due in part to its close proximity to the coast. Lester weakened to a tropical depression as it made landfall east of Acapulco on the afternoon of September 17, and then rapidly dissipated inland.

As the storm approached, ports in Guerrero were closed due to high waves of 13 ft (4.0 m) in some areas. Also, nearly 600 emergency shelters were opened in preparation for evacuations due to imminent threat of rivers and streams overflowing. Lester caused damage throughout much of Guerrero as its heavy rains caused flooding and mudslides. One person in Marquelia Municipality died when swept away by water currents. The most severe damage occurred in Coyuca de Benítez, where over 700 houses were flooded. Additionally, towns in Acatepec, in the state's mountain region, were left isolated due a washed-out roadway.

=== Tropical Storm Madeline ===
- Tropical storm (SSHWS)
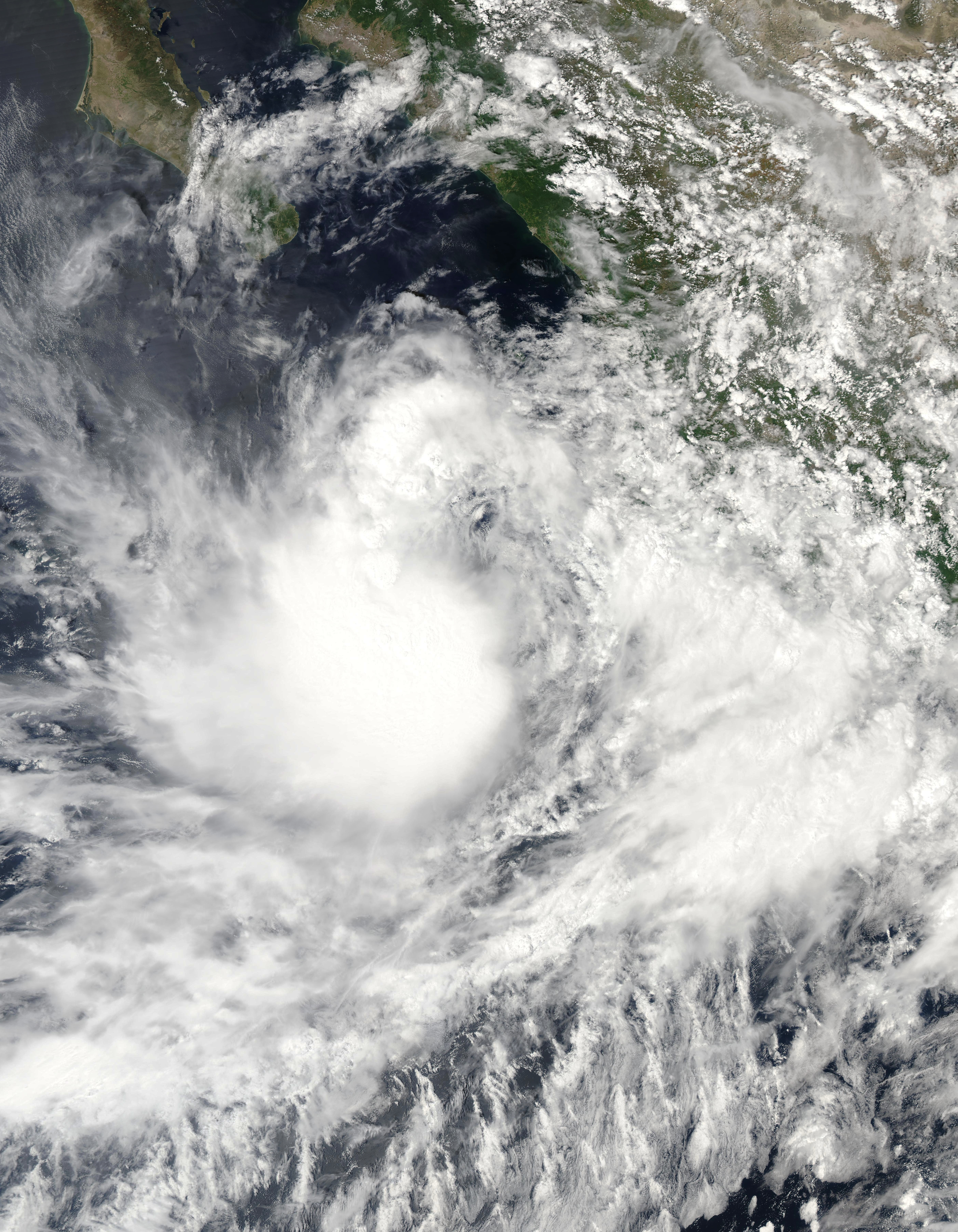
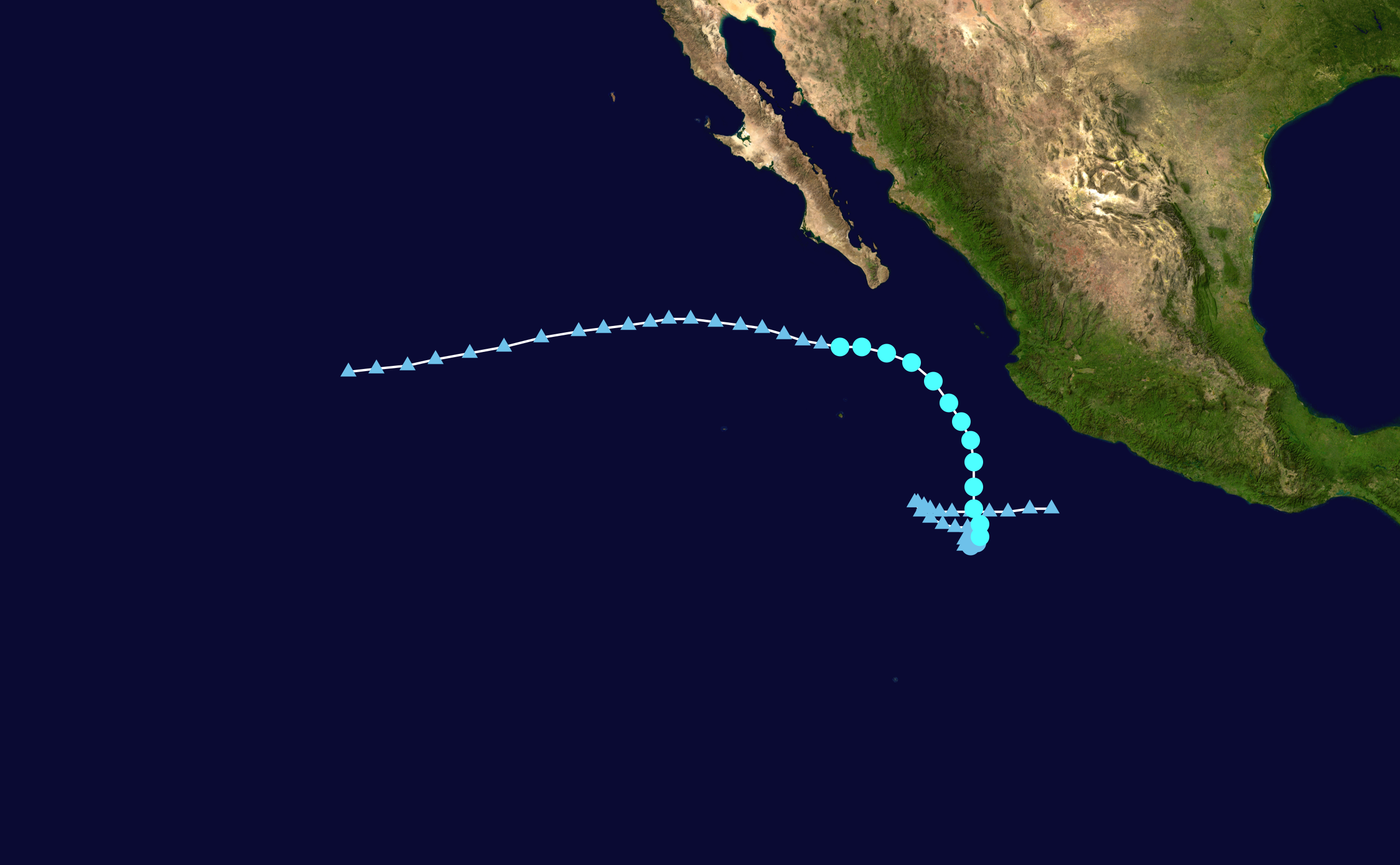
- Duration: September 16 – September 20
- Peak intensity: 65 mph (100 km/h) (1-min); 991 mbar (hPa)

On September 12, the NHC began monitoring for potential development a small area of low pressure located off the coast of southwestern Mexico producing limited showers and thunderstorms. After several days, the disturbance became sufficiently organized on September 17, to be classified as Tropical Storm Madeline. After this, however, the storm strengthened very little though much of the next day due to deep-layer easterly shear. When it diminished on September 18, Madeline's low-level center became embedded underneath the northeastern portion of an area of deep convection with cloud tops as cold as −85 °C (−120 °F). As a result, the storm was able to attain maximum sustained winds of 65 mph (100 km/h) on September 19, when located about 175 mi (280 km) south-southeast of the southern tip of the Baja California peninsula. Later that same day, Madeline began to weaken, becoming first a tropical depression and then a remnant low on September 20.

Two deaths were attributed to Madeline as it moved along the coast of southwest Mexico, with one person remaining missing. Several coastal states were hit by heavy rains, strong winds and rough surf from the storm. Localized flooding was also reported from the storm. Despite this, there were no reports of significant damage.

=== Tropical Storm Newton ===
- Tropical storm (SSHWS)
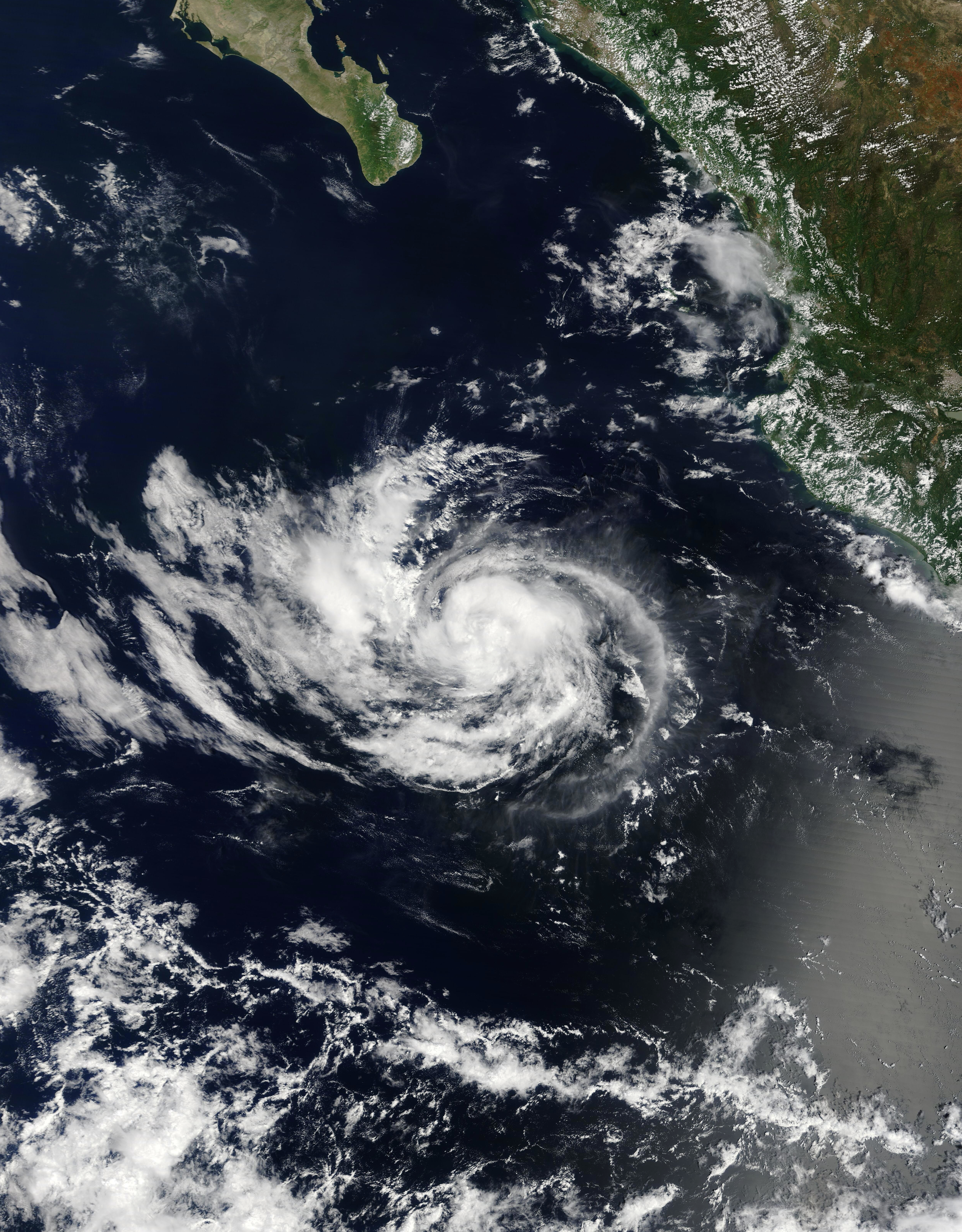
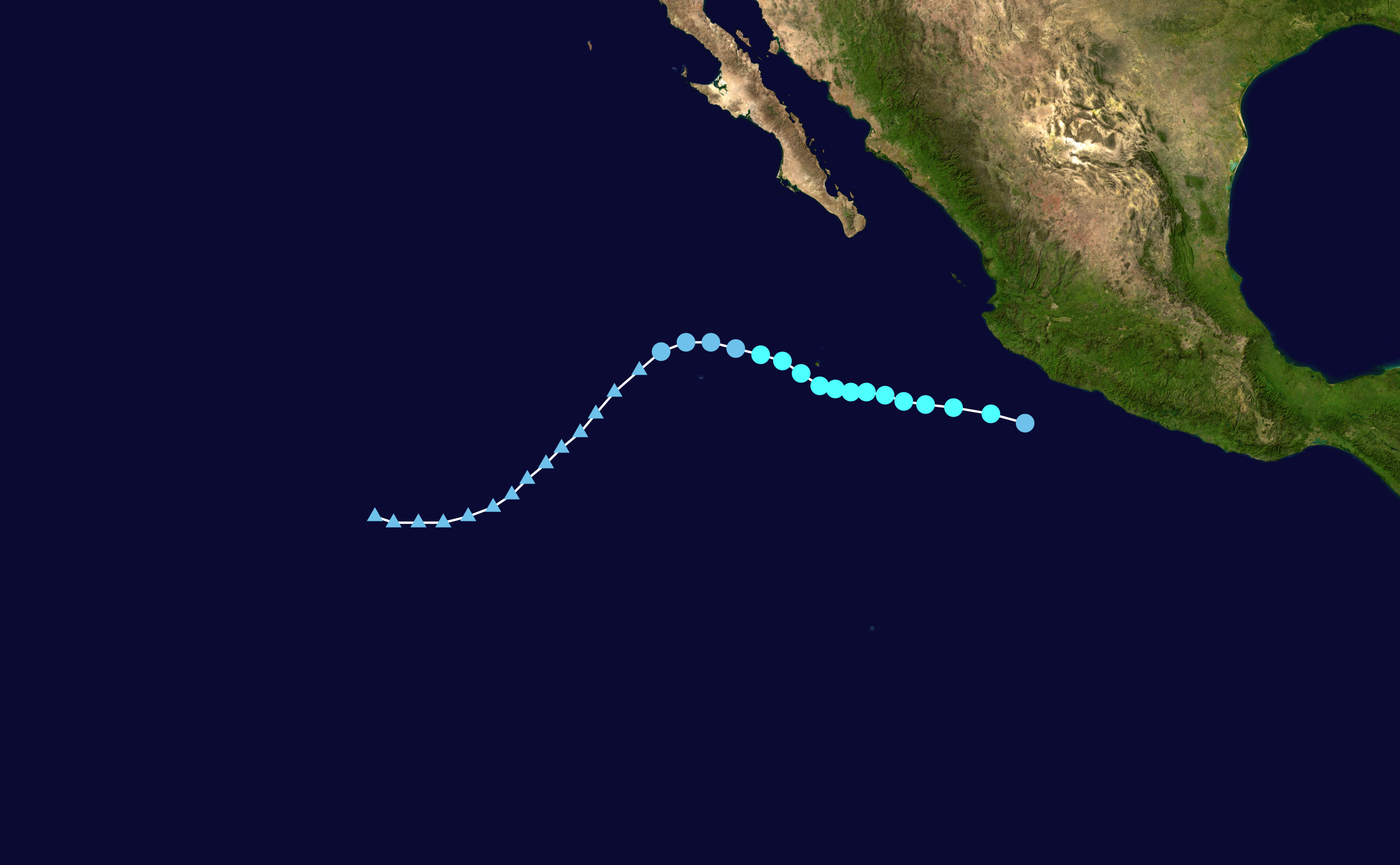
- Duration: September 21 – September 25
- Peak intensity: 65 mph (100 km/h) (1-min); 997 mbar (hPa)

A small area of low pressure formed near the coast of southwestern Mexico on September 20. Rain and thunderstorm activity within the disturbance quickly became better organized, resulting in the formation of Tropical Depression Fifteen-E at 21:00 UTC on September 21, and then of Tropical Storm Newton less than four hours later. As the storm moved west-northwestward on September 22, a tiny eye-like feature and new deep convection formed in the core, enabling it to generate sustained winds of 65 mph (100 km/h). Later that day however, the convection at the storm's center collapsed suddenly, and although it briefly recovered, Newton began to weaken again the next morning as it passed near Socorro Island. It became a tropical depression on September 24, then degenerated into a remnant low one day later. For several days afterward, through September 29, the NHC continued monitoring Newton's remnants for possible regeneration, and its associated shower activity briefly become slightly better organized on September 28, before being stymied by increasingly unfavorable conditions.

=== Hurricane Orlene ===
- Category 4 hurricane (SSHWS)
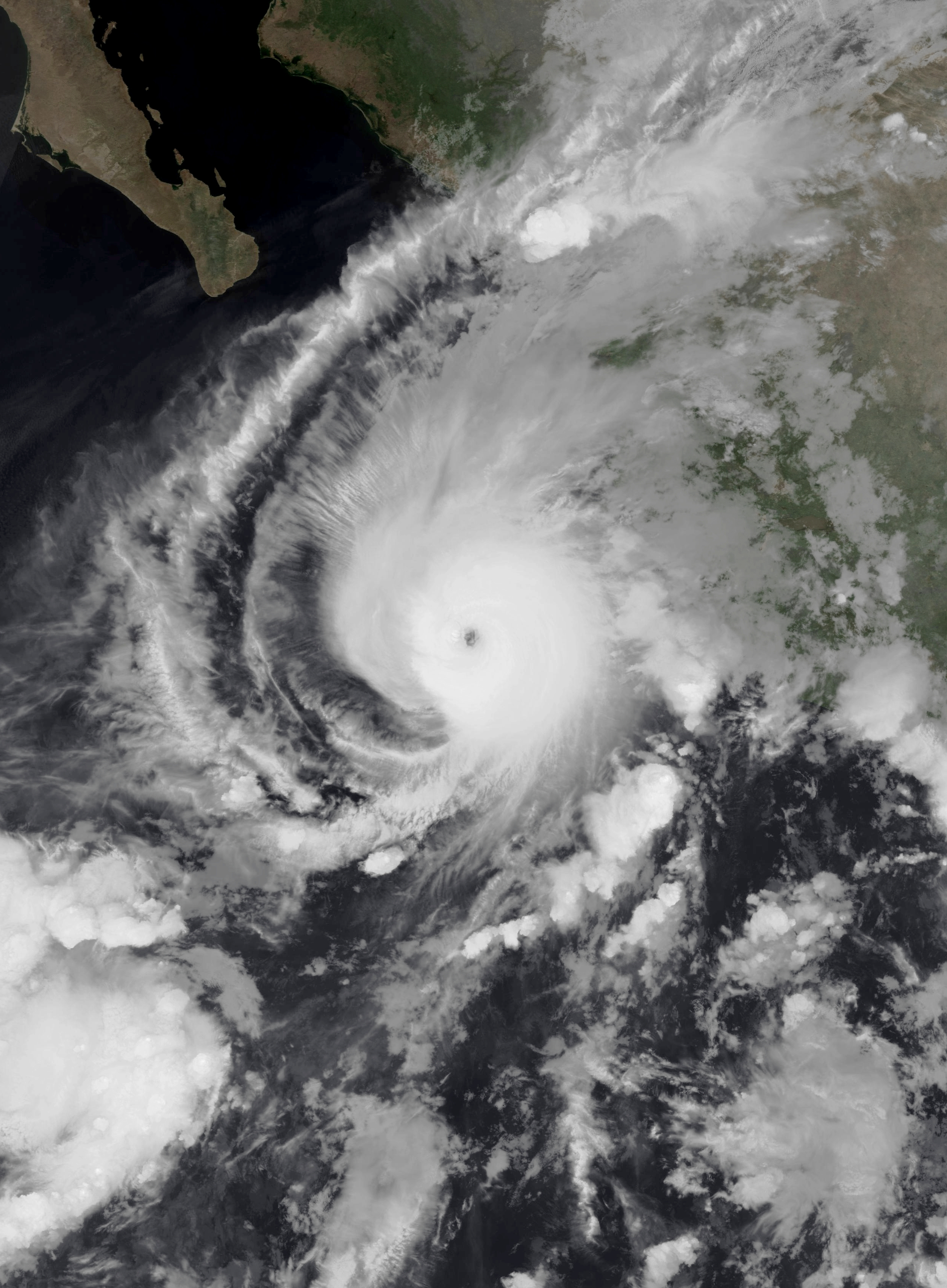
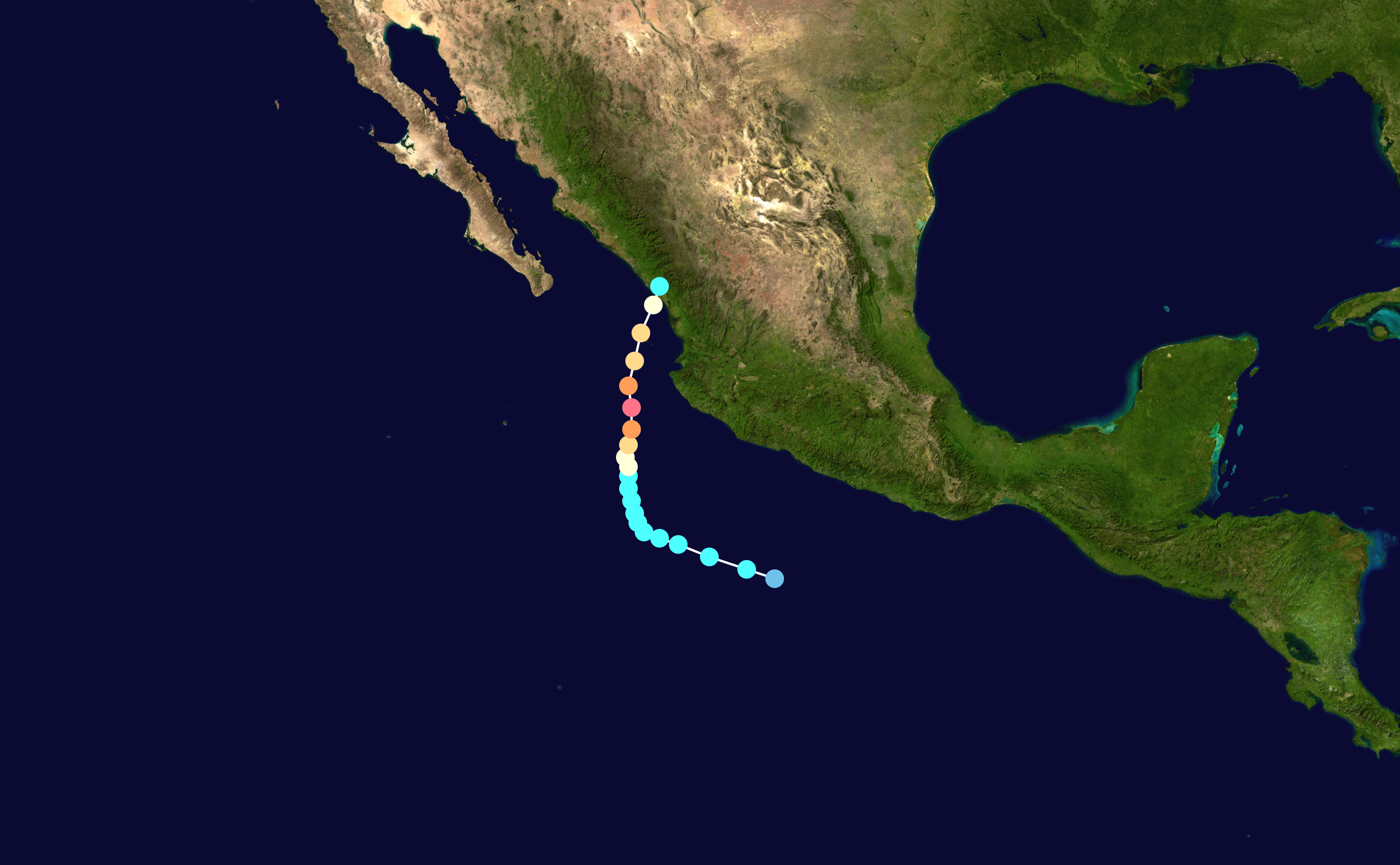
- Duration: September 28 – October 3
- Peak intensity: 130 mph (215 km/h) (1-min); 954 mbar (hPa)

On September 26, the NHC noted that a low pressure area had formed south of the southwestern Mexico coast within an environment conducive for gradual tropical development. Shower and thunderstorm activity associated with this low increased the following day, and it steadily gained organization on September 28; the system developed a well-defined center late that day, becoming a tropical depression. Further development occurred overnight and the system intensified into Tropical Storm Orlene at 09:00 UTC on September 29, while located about 295 mi (475 km) south of Manzanillo, Colima. The next day, as the storm moved northward along the edge of a ridge over central Mexico, it generated a few bursts of deep convection and developed a small inner core with a curved band to the south. Orlene intensified into a Category 1 hurricane at 15:00 UTC on October 1, and to Category 2 strength about eight hours later. Orlene continued to rapidly intensify until it peaked with Category 4 strength at 09:00 UTC on October 2, its maximum sustained winds having increased from 65 mph (100 km/h) to 130 mph (215 km/h) in 24 hours. Wind shear from the southwest began to adversely affect the system soon thereafter, weakening it to a Category 3 hurricane six hours later, and then to Category 2 that night as it passed over the Islas Marías. Later, at 14:45 UTC on October 3, Orlene made landfall in Escuinapa Municipality, Sinaloa, as a Category 1 hurricane with winds of 85 mph (140 km/h). The system rapidly weakened inland, becoming a tropical depression by 21:00 UTC that same day, and then dissipating over the Sierra Madre mountains several hours after that.

Orlene brought heavy rain to several states in Western Mexico, which resulted in widespread flooding and several mudslides in Sinaloa and Nayarit, but there were no casualties reported as the storm moved through. Damage in San Blas, Nayarit was over 12 million pesos (US$600,000).

=== Tropical Storm Paine ===
- Tropical storm (SSHWS)
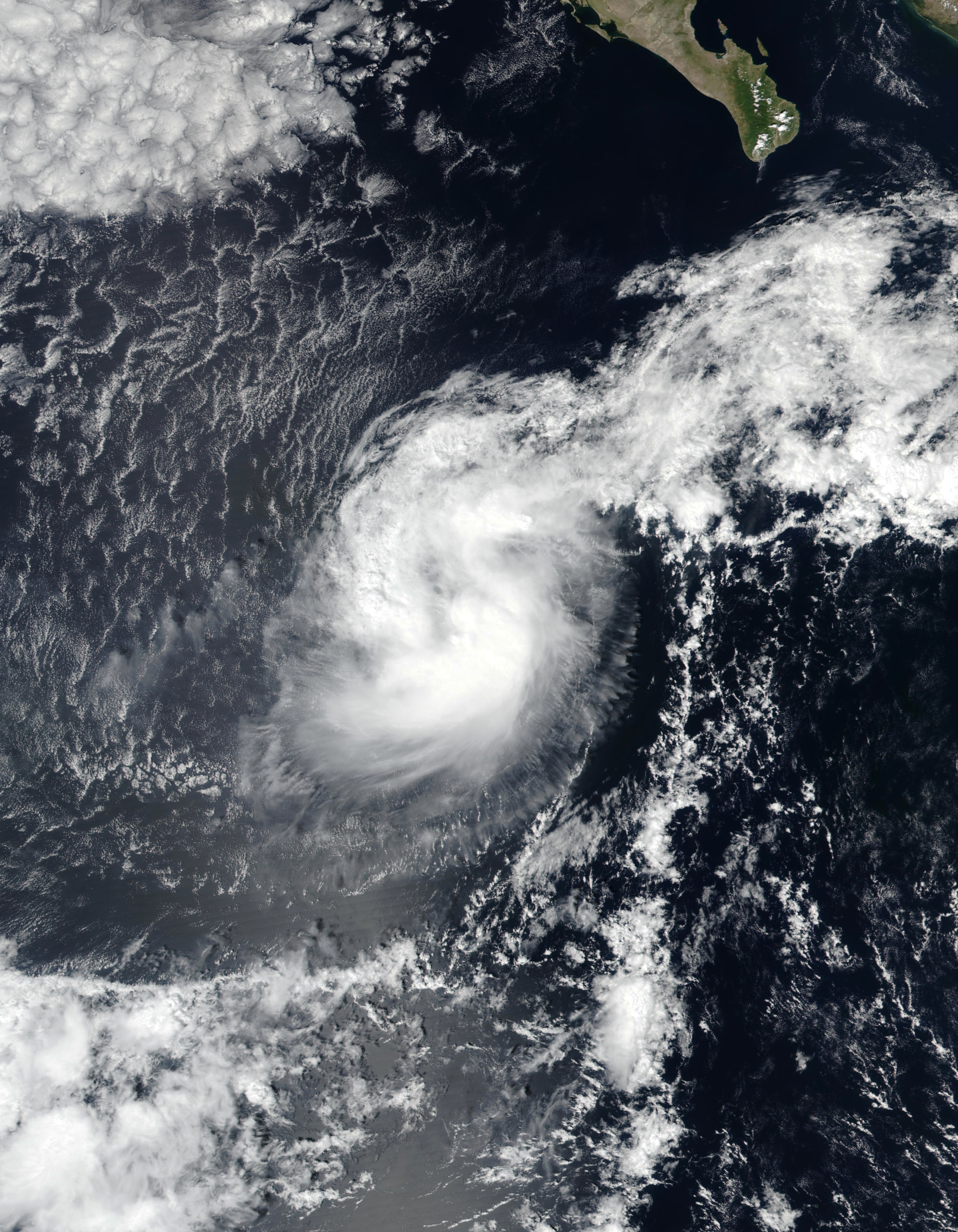
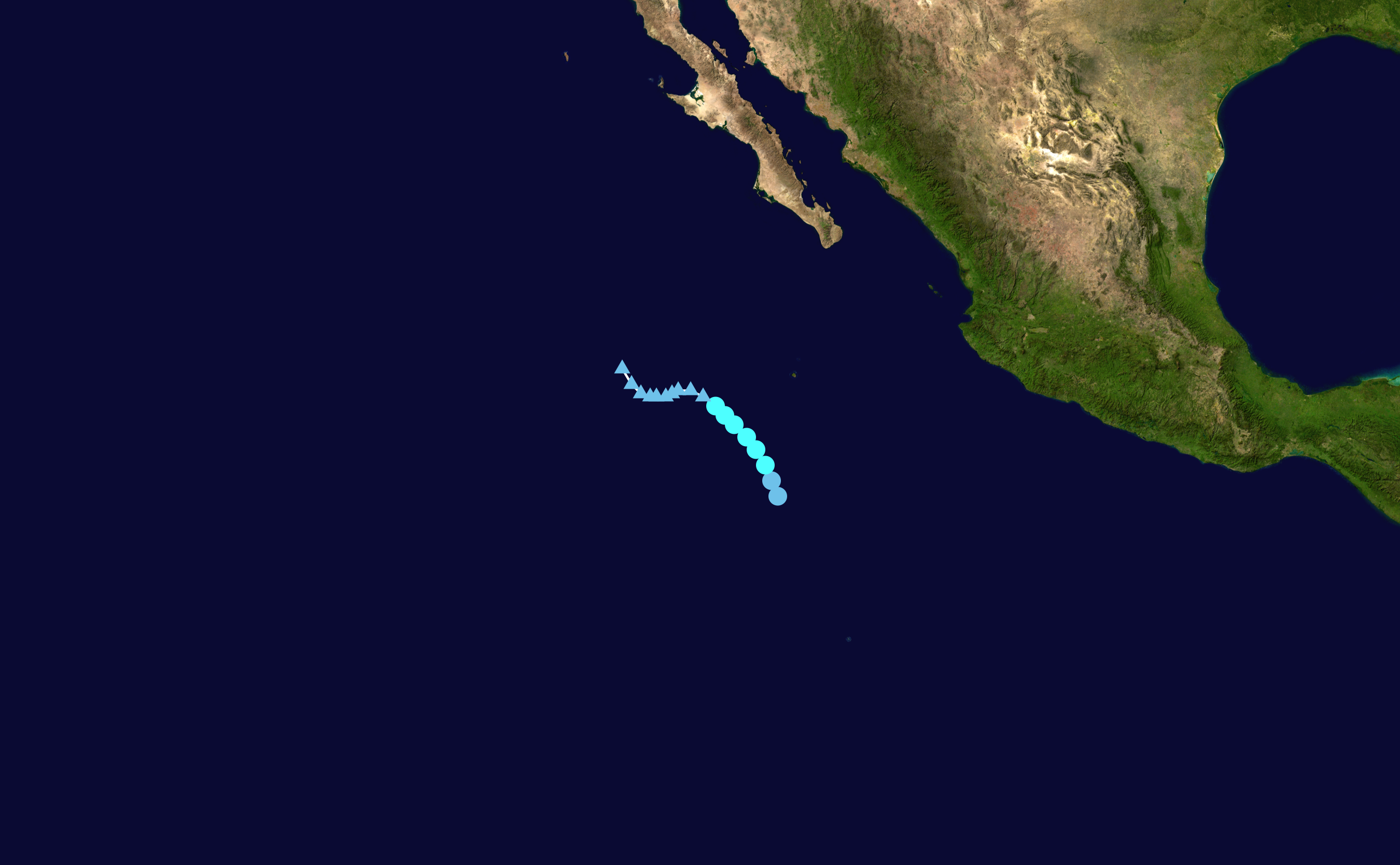
- Duration: October 3 – October 5
- Peak intensity: 45 mph (75 km/h) (1-min); 1005 mbar (hPa)

On September 30, the NHC began monitoring a newly formed area of disturbed weather some 600 mi (970 km) south-southwest of the southern tip of the Baja California peninsula. Shower and thunderstorm activity within the disturbance increased and began showing signs of becoming organized on October 1, and satellite imagery the following day indicated that its surface circulation had become better defined. These trends continued, resulting in the formation of Tropical Storm Paine on October 3. There was an increase in banding around the western and southern portions of the storm's circulation into the following day, and it strengthened to an intensity of 45 mph (75 km/h). This was fleeting however, and by the time the storm passed near Clarion Island early on October 5, it was devoid of deep convection. Later that same day, Paine degenerated into a remnant low.

=== Tropical Storm Julia ===
- Tropical storm (SSHWS)
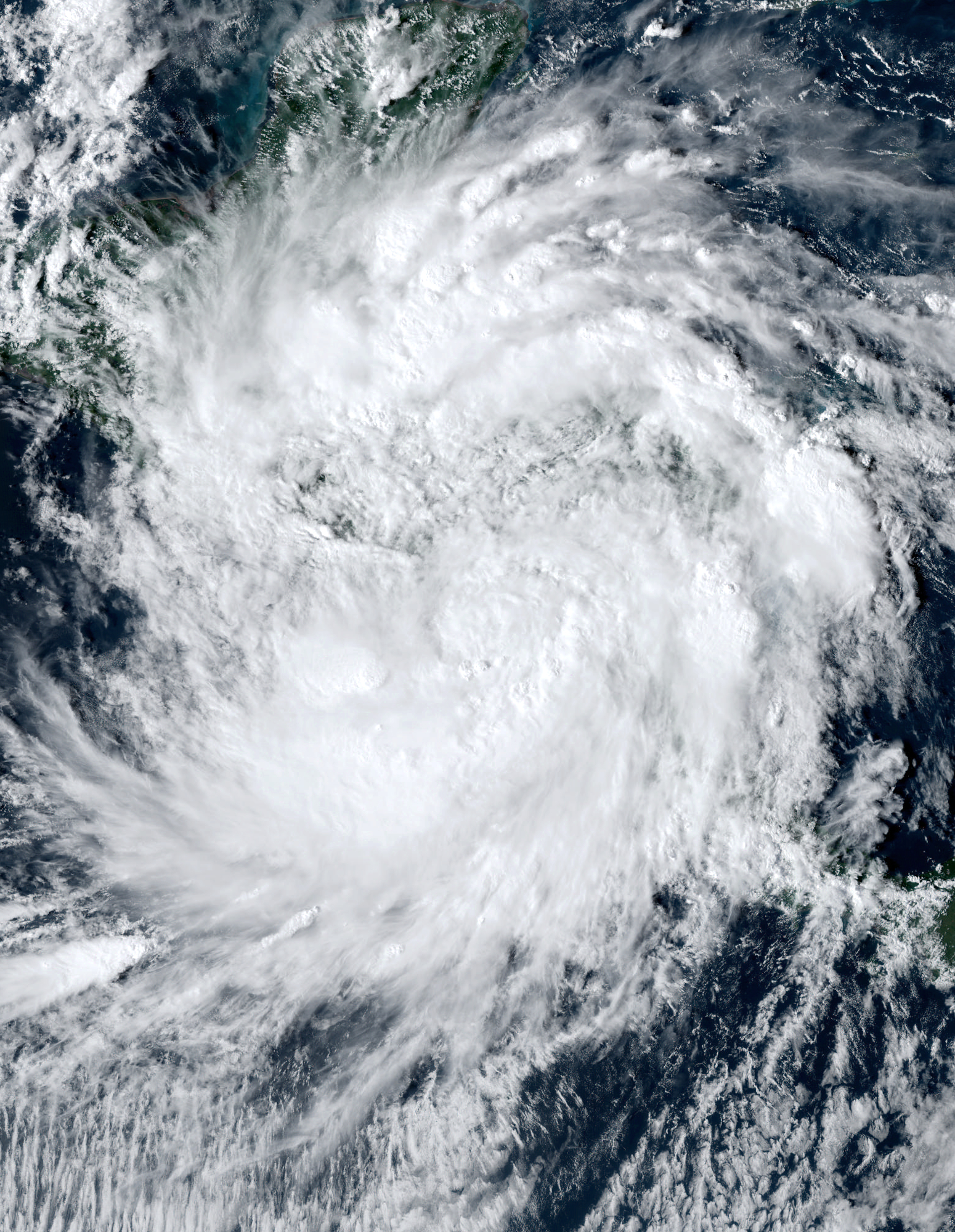
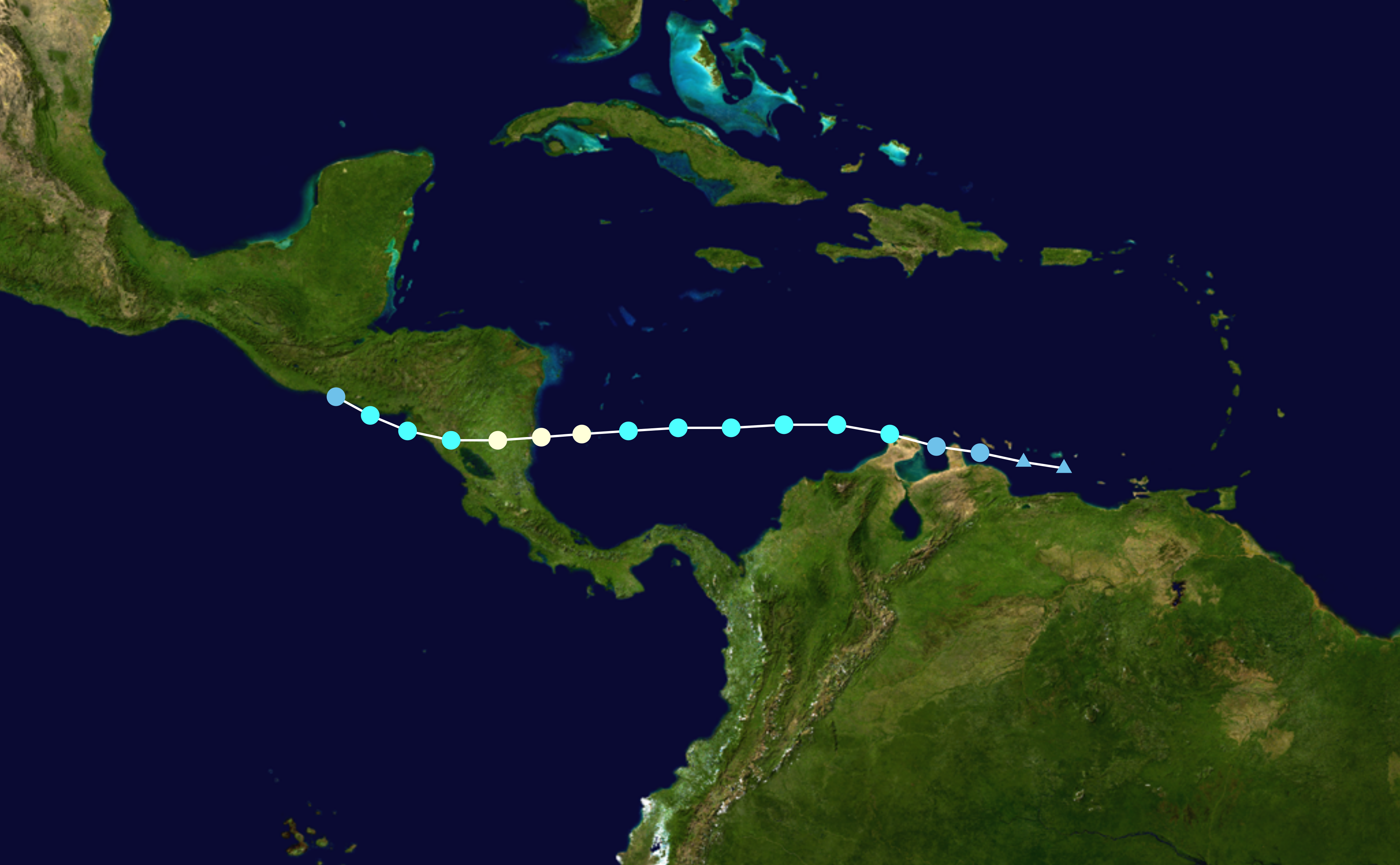
- Duration: October 9 (Entered basin) – October 10
- Peak intensity: 45 mph (75 km/h) (1-min); 993 mbar (hPa)

At 21:00 UTC on October 9, Tropical Storm Julia left the Atlantic basin and was designated as an East Pacific system about 45 mi (70 km) west-northwest of Managua, Nicaragua, and its center emerged off shore a few hours later. The system moved to the west and then to the west-northwest parallel to and very near the coasts of Nicaragua and El Salvador with maximum sustained winds of 40 mph (65 km/h). It maintained a band of deep convection over the southern and eastern portions of its circulation, the areas not still interacting with the mountainous terrain inland. At about 12:00 UTC on October 10, the center of the storm crossed the coast of El Salvador, about 35 mi (56 km) west of San Salvador, and then weakened to a tropical depression, with the whole of its circulation becoming stretched. Later that same day, Julia degenerated into an open trough overland.

While an Atlantic hurricane and then tropical storm, Julia's heavy rains caused widespread life-threatening flash floods and deadly mudslides throughout Central America; several storm related fatalities were reported across the region. Torrential rain continued to fall in northwestern Central America as Julia moved inland from the Pacific.

=== Hurricane Roslyn ===
- Category 4 hurricane (SSHWS)
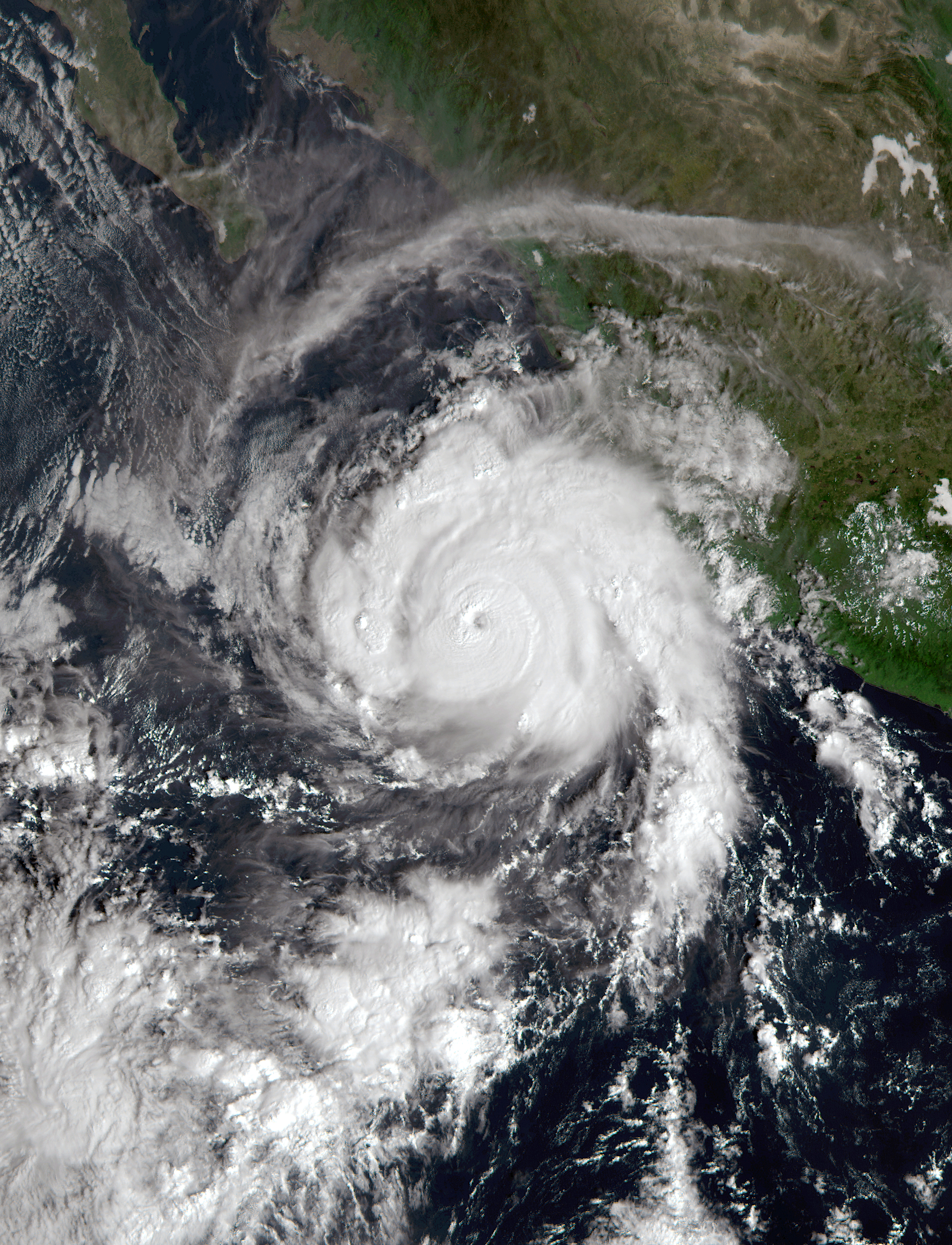
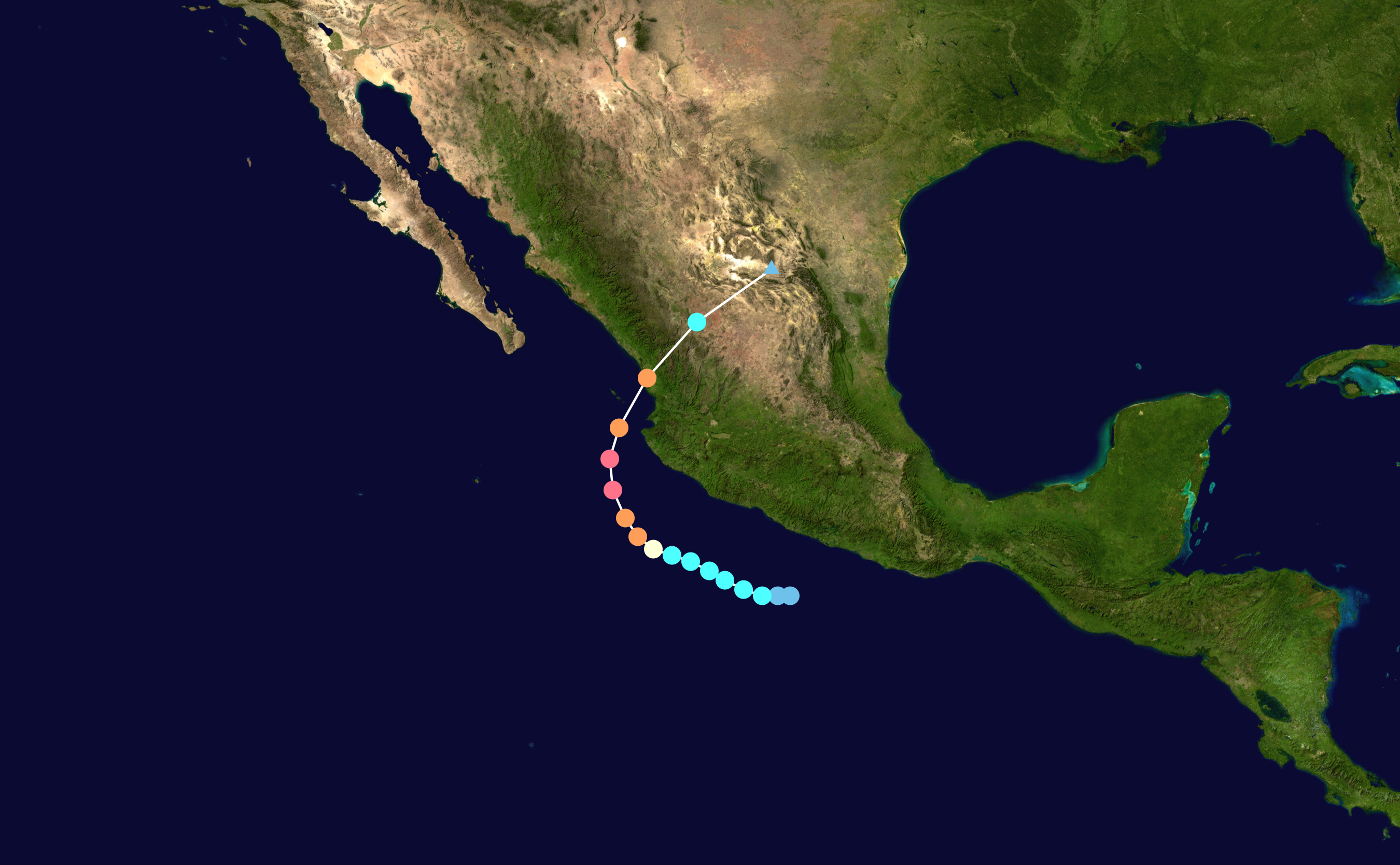
- Duration: October 20 – October 23
- Peak intensity: 130 mph (215 km/h) (1-min); 954 mbar (hPa)

On October 16, the NHC began monitoring an area of disturbed weather south of the southern coast of Mexico. Thunderstorm activity increased and became better organized within the disturbance over the next few days, and the low's circulation become increasingly better defined as well. This trend continued, and early on October 20, it developed into Tropical Depression Nineteen-E. Soon thereafter, the depression strengthened into Tropical Storm Roslyn. Roslyn became a hurricane at 03:00 UTC, on October 22, and, within 12 hours rapidly intensified to a Category 4 hurricane with sustained winds of 130 mph (215 km/h). Roslyn quickly lost intensity after hitting Mexico.

The rains and winds associated with Roslyn left four people dead in the state of Nayarit. Damages statewide were stood at MX$991 million (US$56.7 million).

== Storm names ==
The following list of names was used for named storms that formed in the North Pacific Ocean east of 140°W during 2022. This is the same list used in the 2016 season, as no names were retired following that season. There were no names retired following the 2022 season, so the same list will be used again for the 2028 season.

- Agatha
- Blas
- Celia
- Darby *
- Estelle
- Frank
- Georgette
- Howard
- Ivette
- Javier
- Kay
- Lester
- Madeline
- Newton
- Orlene
- Paine
- Roslyn
- Seymour (unused)
- Tina (unused)
- Virgil (unused)
- Winifred (unused)
- Xavier (unused)
- Yolanda (unused)
- Zeke (unused)

- Additionally, Bonnie and Julia entered the northeastern Pacific basin from the Atlantic basin after crossing over Central America as tropical cyclones. As the systems crossed between basins intact, they retained their Atlantic-list names.

For storms that form in the North Pacific from 140°W to the International Date Line, the names come from a series of four rotating lists. Names are used one after the other without regard to year, and when the bottom of one list is reached, the next named storm receives the name at the top of the next list. No storms formed within the area in 2022. Named storms in the table above that crossed into the area during the season are noted (*).

== Season effects ==
This is a table of all of the storms that formed in the 2022 Pacific hurricane season. It includes their name, duration (within the basin), peak classification and intensities, areas affected, damage, and death totals. Deaths in parentheses are additional and indirect (an example of an indirect death would be a traffic accident), but were still related to that storm. Damage and deaths include totals while the storm was extratropical, a wave, or a low, and all of the damage figures are in 2022 USD.

Saffir–Simpson scale
| TD | TS | C1 | C2 | C3 | C4 | C5 |

2022 Pacific hurricane season season statistics
| Storm name | Dates active | Storm category at peak intensity | Max 1-min wind mph (km/h) | Min. press. (mbar) | Areas affected | Damage (US$) | Deaths | Ref(s). |
|---|---|---|---|---|---|---|---|---|
| Agatha | May 28–31 | Category 2 hurricane | 110 (175) | 964 | Southern Mexico | $327 million | 9 | |
| Blas | June 14–19 | Category 1 hurricane | 85 (140) | 978 | Southwestern Mexico, Revillagigedo Islands | Minimal | 4 | |
| Celia | June 16–28 | Tropical storm | 60 (95) | 997 | El Salvador, Guatemala, Southern Mexico, Revillagigedo Islands | Minimal | 1 | |
| Bonnie | July 2–9 | Category 3 hurricane | 115 (185) | 964 | Nicaragua, Costa Rica, Guatemala, El Salvador, Southwestern Mexico, Revillagigedo Islands (after crossover) | Unknown | 1 | |
| Darby | July 9–17 | Category 4 hurricane | 140 (220) | 953 | Hawaii | Minimal | None | |
| Estelle | July 15–21 | Category 1 hurricane | 85 (140) | 985 | Revillagigedo Islands | Minimal | None | |
| Frank | July 26 – August 2 | Category 1 hurricane | 90 (150) | 976 | None | None | None | |
| Georgette | July 27 – August 3 | Tropical storm | 60 (95) | 998 | None | None | None | |
| Howard | August 6–10 | Category 1 hurricane | 85 (140) | 983 | Revillagigedo Islands | Minimal | None | |
| Ivette | August 13–16 | Tropical storm | 40 (65) | 1005 | None | None | None | |
| Javier | September 1–3 | Tropical storm | 50 (85) | 999 | Revillagigedo Islands, Baja California Sur | $5.81 million | None | |
| Kay | September 4–9 | Category 2 hurricane | 100 (155) | 968 | Southwestern Mexico, Revillagigedo Islands, Baja California peninsula, Southern California, Arizona | $63.5 million | 4 (2) | |
| Lester | September 15–17 | Tropical storm | 40 (65) | 1005 | Southwestern Mexico | Unknown | 5 | |
| Madeline | September 16–20 | Tropical storm | 65 (100) | 991 | Southwestern Mexico | Minimal | 2 | |
| Newton | September 21–25 | Tropical storm | 65 (100) | 997 | None | None | None | |
| Orlene | September 28 – October 3 | Category 4 hurricane | 130 (215) | 954 | Islas Marías, Western Mexico | >$600,000 | None | |
| Paine | October 3–5 | Tropical storm | 45 (75) | 1005 | None | None | None | |
| Julia | October 9–10 | Tropical storm | 45 (75) | 993 | Nicaragua, El Salvador, Guatemala (after crossover) | None | None | |
| Roslyn | October 20–23 | Category 4 hurricane | 130 (215) | 954 | Western Mexico | $49.7 million | 4 | |
Season aggregates
| 19 systems | May 28 – October 24 | | 140 (220) | 949 | | >$447 million | 32 | |

== See also ==
- Weather of 2022
- Tropical cyclones in 2022
- Pacific hurricane
- List of Pacific hurricane records
- 2022 Atlantic hurricane season
- 2022 Pacific typhoon season
- 2022 North Indian Ocean cyclone season
- South-West Indian Ocean cyclone seasons: 2021–22, 2022–23
- Australian region cyclone seasons: 2021–22, 2022–23
- South Pacific cyclone seasons: 2021–22, 2022–23
