= Hurricane Julia (2022) =

Category 1 Atlantic and Pacific hurricane

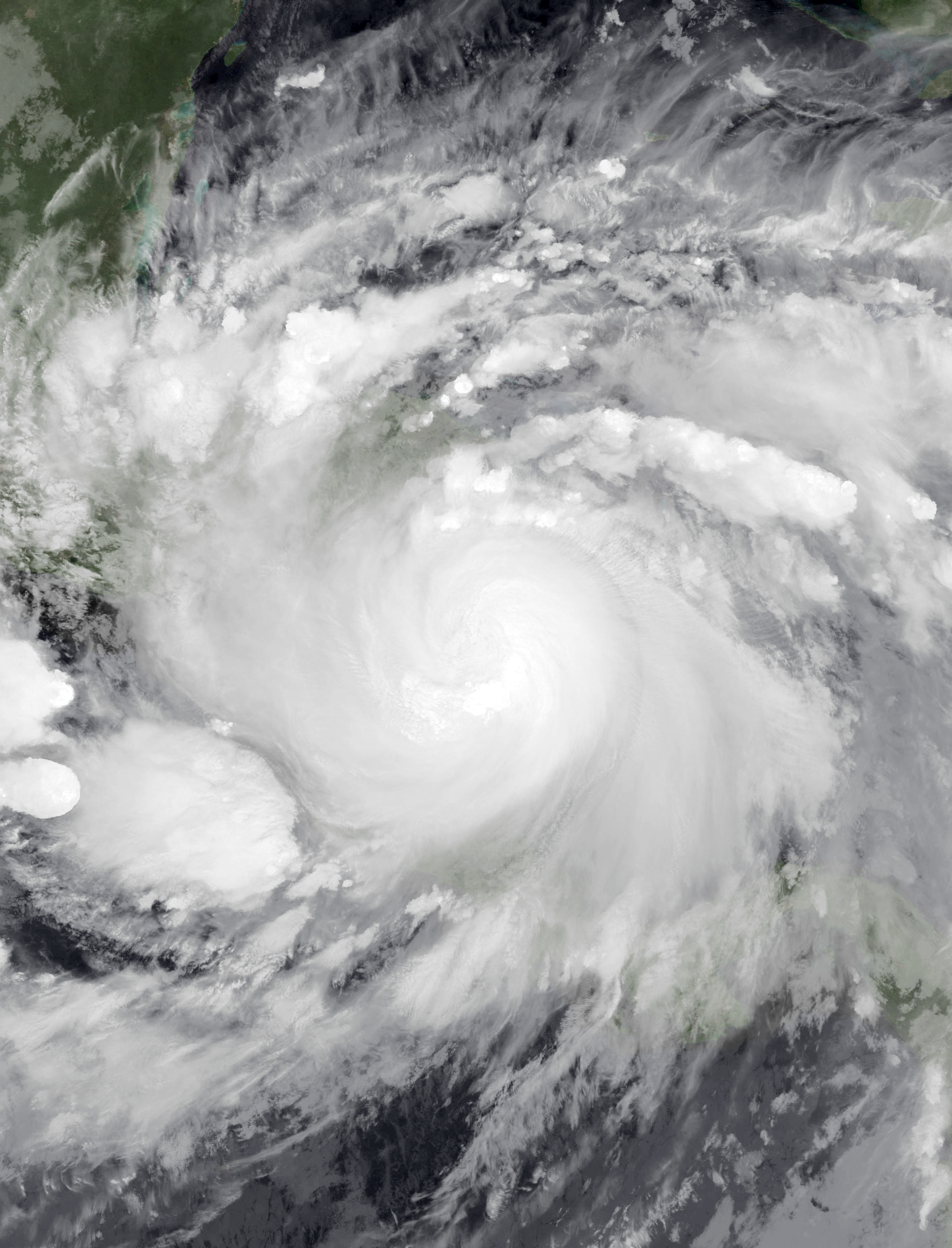
- Hurricane Julia at peak intensity while making landfall in Nicaragua on October 9

Meteorological history
- Formed: October 7, 2022
- Dissipated: October 10, 2022

Category 1 hurricane
- 1-minute sustained (SSHWS/NWS)
- Highest winds: 85 mph (140 km/h)
- Lowest pressure: 982 mbar (hPa); 29.00 inHg

Overall effects
- Fatalities: 89 (35 direct, 54 indirect)
- Damage: >$762 million (2022 USD)
- Areas affected: Trinidad and Tobago, Venezuela, ABC islands, Colombia, Nicaragua, El Salvador, Honduras, Guatemala, Panama, Costa Rica, Mexico
- IBTrACS /
- Part of the 2022 Atlantic and Pacific hurricane seasons

Hurricane Julia was a deadly tropical cyclone that caused significant impacts in Central America as a Category 1 hurricane in October 2022. The tenth named storm and fifth hurricane of the 2022 Atlantic hurricane season, Julia formed from a tropical wave over the southern Caribbean Sea on October 7, just off the coast of South America. Only one storm on record, Tropical Storm Bret in 1993, has tracked further south over South America.

On October 9, it became a hurricane and proceeded to make landfall in Nicaragua. It emerged into the Pacific Ocean as a tropical storm late that same day, becoming the eighteenth tropical storm of the 2022 Pacific hurricane season, and the second storm of the season to survive the crossover between the Atlantic–Pacific basin, after Bonnie in July. The storm then briefly moved along the coast of El Salvador, before moving inland and degenerating into an open trough over Guatemala on October 10.

Julia brought heavy rains to much of Central America, causing life-threatening flash floods and deadly mudslides, exacerbating an already devastating rainy season. Floods, storm surge and the total or partial collapse of houses forced the evacuation of thousands of people. Its precursor disturbance triggered similar impacts in northern Venezuela. Altogether, Julia was responsible for 35 direct deaths, 54 indirect deaths, and at least US $762 million in damage.

== Meteorological history ==
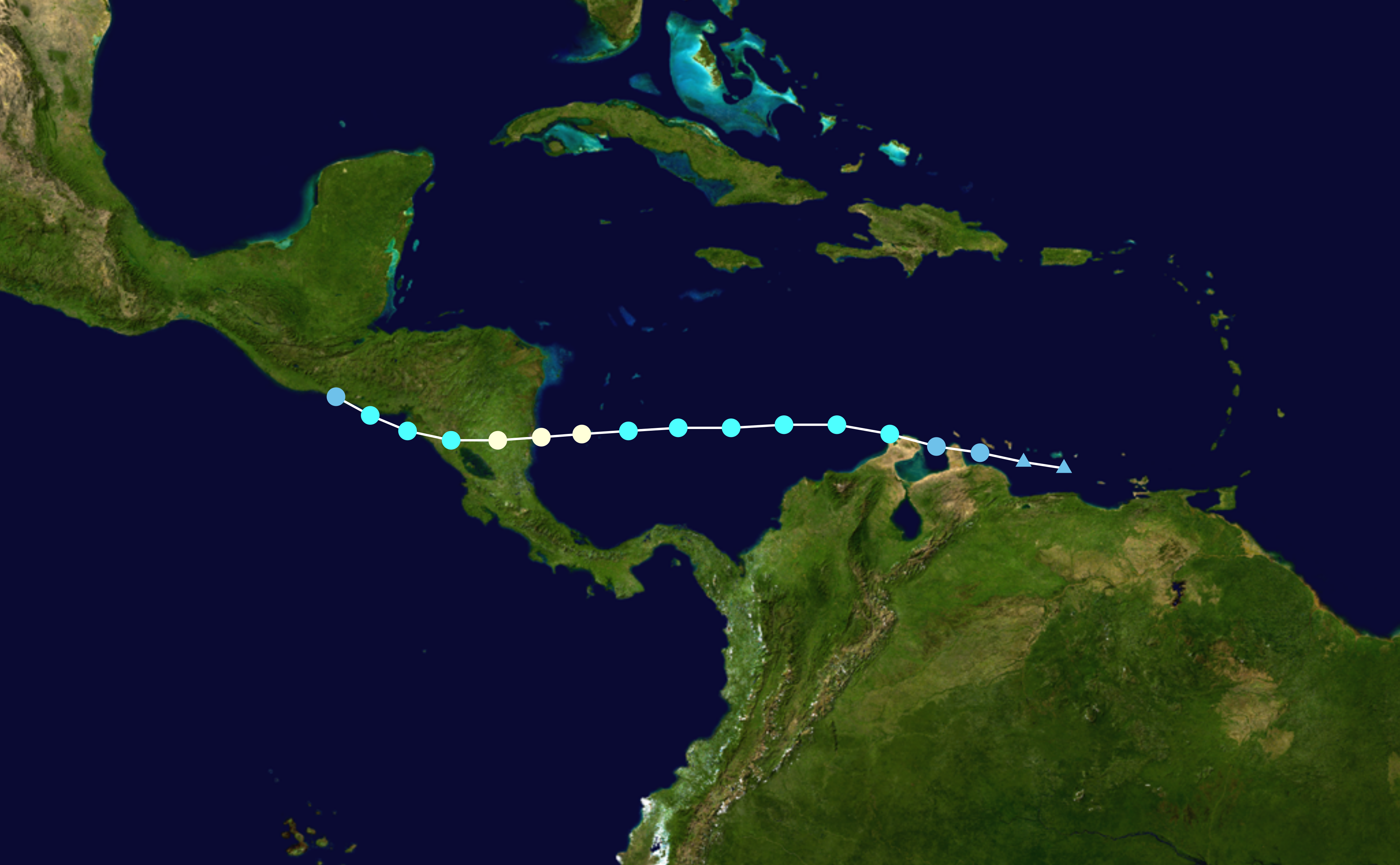
Map plotting the storm's track and intensity, according to the Saffir–Simpson scale Map key Saffir–Simpson scale Tropical depression (≤38 mph, ≤62 km/h) Tropical storm (39–73 mph, 63–118 km/h) Category 1 (74–95 mph, 119–153 km/h) Category 2 (96–110 mph, 154–177 km/h) Category 3 (111–129 mph, 178–208 km/h) Category 4 (130–156 mph, 209–251 km/h) Category 5 (≥157 mph, ≥252 km/h) Unknown Storm type Tropical cyclone Subtropical cyclone Extratropical cyclone, remnant low, tropical disturbance, or monsoon depression

On October 2, the National Hurricane Center (NHC) began monitoring a tropical wave over the central tropical Atlantic. A broad area of low pressure formed on October 4, as it approached the southern Windward Islands. Due to the threat the developing system posed to land areas in the southern Caribbean, the NHC initiated advisories on it as Potential Tropical Cyclone Thirteen on October 6. By 00:00 UTC on October 7, the disturbance had attained sufficient circulation and organized convection to be designated as a tropical depression, while located near the coast of Venezuela. A few hours later, the westward moving depression traversed the Paraguaná Peninsula and then the Guajira Peninsula. During this time, a strong burst of deep convection developed near the center of the depression and its central banding features became better developed, resulting in it strengthening into Tropical Storm Julia soon afterwards. That afternoon, the storm began to gain strength as it moved through the warm southwest Caribbean in an environment with moist air and low wind shear. Julia became a hurricane 00:00 UTC on October 9, about 80 mi (130 km) east of the coast of Nicaragua. At 06:00 UTC that morning, the hurricane attained peak intensity with maximum sustained winds of 85 mph (140 km/h) and a minimum barometric pressure of 982 mbar (29.00 inHg), and made landfall a little over an hour later near Laguna de Perlas, Nicaragua, at peak intensity.

The system then gradually weakened to a tropical storm as it moved westward across Nicaragua, while maintaining a well-defined circulation and deep convection persisting near the center. Late on October 9, Julia, severely weakened, moved off the western coast of Nicaragua and into the East Pacific basin. At 11:00 UTC on October 10, the center of the storm crossed the coast of El Salvador, near Acajutla, with sustained winds of 40 mph (65 km/h). It quickly weakened to a tropical depression inland, and then dissipated later that same day. Residual energy from Julia subsequently contributed to the formation a few days later, of Tropical Storm Karl.

== Preparations and impact ==
Casualties and damage reported
Country	Deaths	Damage (USD)
Venezuela	54*	Unknown
Colombia	0	Unknown
Nicaragua	5	>$400 million
Honduras	4	Unknown
El Salvador	10	Unknown
Guatemala	14	Unknown
Costa Rica	0	Unknown
Panama	2	>$6 million
Total:	89	>$762 million
* indicates indirect deaths

=== South America ===
==== Venezuela ====
While a tropical depression, the system brought heavy rain and flooding to much of the Venezuelan Caribbean. As a result of additional rainfall after the storm passed through, at least 54 people died and dozens went missing when mud and debris inundated Las Tejerías, Aragua, on October 8.

==== Colombia ====
The center of Julia passed just south of San Andrés Island while it was reaching hurricane strength east of Nicaragua. At least 174 homes were destroyed by Julia, and 5,247 homes and a health center were damaged.

=== Central America ===
Julia caused approximately US$762 million in damages in Central America.

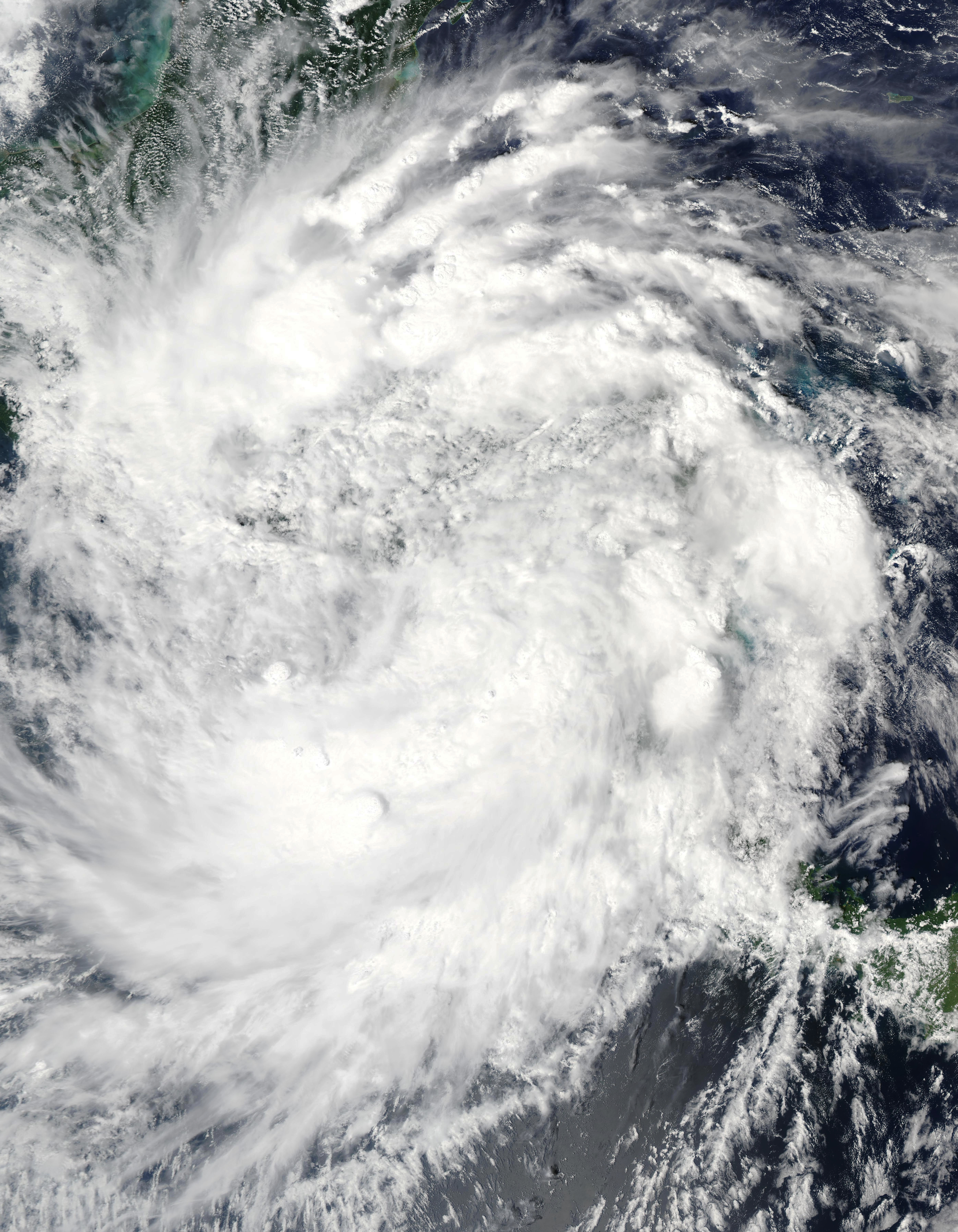
Tropical Storm Julia over Nicaragua on October 9

==== Nicaragua ====
The hurricane left at least 1 million people without power and forced the evacuation of 13,000 families. Of the nation's 143 municipalities, 96 reported varying degrees of damage. Overall, Julia left at least $400 million in damage and five deaths in Nicaragua.

==== Honduras ====
The Government of Honduras opened more than 1,137 shelters nationwide, with 9,200 people utilizing them by October 10. A red alert, the highest level of warning, was issued for 10 of Honduras's 18 departments. Many homes were flooded along the Chamelecón River, which continued to rise as of October 10. Heavy rains brought water levels at several dams to above or near maximum capacity. The Ulúa River rose to 6.79 m (22.3 ft) near Santiago, exceeding the red alert stage for flooding. The most significant effects were felt in Yoro Department. Throughout Honduras, Julia killed four people and left two others missing as of October 11. A total of 103,960 people were affected, 3,412 of whom required evacuation. A total of 278 homes were destroyed and a further 397 suffered varying degrees of damage.

==== El Salvador ====
On October 8, the Government of El Salvador declared an orange alert for the entire territory due to the approaching storm. Fishing and recreational activities in rivers, beaches, and lakes were suspended until October 11. Shelters for 3,000 people were prepared. A state of national emergency was declared due to the hurricane. The Government ended up declaring a red alert for civil protection due to the winds throughout the national territory. Tree falls were reported in different municipalities, impeding traffic and damaging cars. Falling branches blocked several major highways; roads were also damaged by landslides. Five soldiers died and another was injured in Comasagua when the home they were seeking refuge in collapsed. In all, Julia was responsible for ten deaths in El Salvador.

==== Guatemala ====
In Guatemala, a total of 457,300 people were affected throughout Guatemala, 1,165 of whom required evacuation. At least 14 people died throughout Guatemala: nine in Huehuetenango Department and five in Alta Verapaz Department.

==== Costa Rica ====
Flooding was reported throughout Costa Rica. 470 people were transported to temporary hospitals, mostly in the South Pacific. Red alerts were issued throughout the country.

==== Panama ====
Two people died in Panama near the border with Costa Rica and around 300 people required evacuation. The Ministry of Education of Panama suspended classes on October 10. A total of two landslides were reported. Due to heavy rains, nearly 868 people were affected. The Tierras Altas District saw significant damage, particularly to road infrastructure. Approximately 70 percent of roads in the district were damaged or blocked by debris, rendering some communities inaccessible. Roughly 240 hectares (590 acres) of crops valued at $6–7 million, half of which were potatoes, were lost.

=== Elsewhere ===
On October 5, the precursor tropical wave brought heavy thunderstorms to several southern Windward Islands. More than 2.0 in (51 mm) of rain fell in Trinidad and Tobago in less than a half-hour, causing significant flash flooding. Significant flooding was also reported in extreme southern Mexico as the system's remnants dissipated.

== See also ==
- List of Atlantic–Pacific crossover hurricanes
- List of Category 1 Atlantic hurricanes
- Timeline of the 2022 Atlantic hurricane season
- Timeline of the 2022 Pacific hurricane season
- Tropical cyclones in 2022
- Weather of 2022
- Other storms of the same name
- Hurricane Cesar–Douglas (1996) - another deadly system had a similar track and crossed into the Pacific basin
- Tropical Storm Matthew (2010) – deadly tropical storm that took a similar track
- Hurricane Otto (2016) – had similarly damaging and deadly impacts in the same region
- Hurricane Iota (2020) – an intense hurricane that had a similar track, affecting Central America
