= Hurricane Roslyn (2022) =

Category 4 Pacific hurricane in 2022

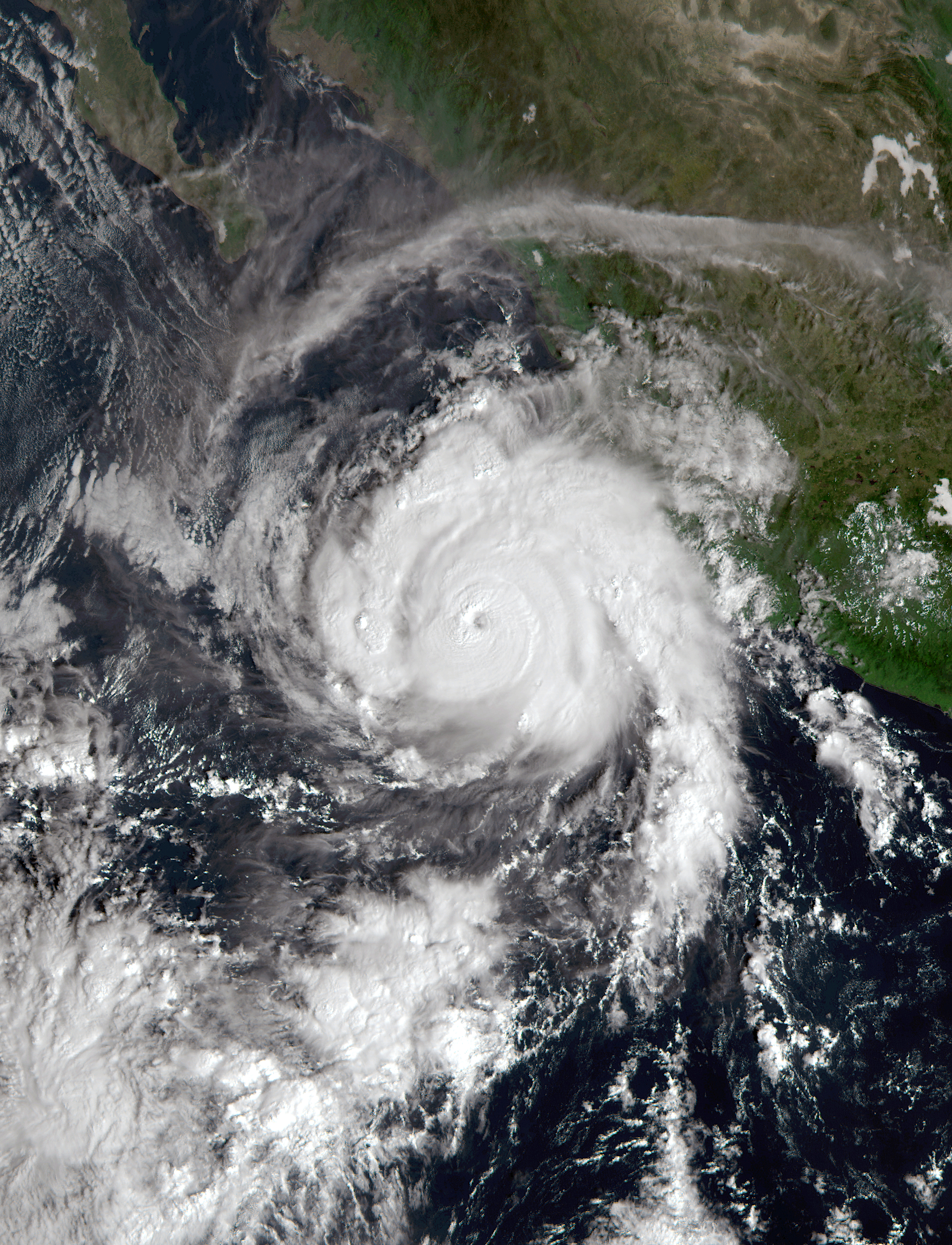
- Hurricane Roslyn at peak intensity offshore Mexico early on October 22

Meteorological history
- Formed: October 20, 2022
- Dissipated: October 24, 2022

Category 4 major hurricane
- 1-minute sustained (SSHWS/NWS)
- Highest winds: 130 mph (215 km/h)
- Lowest pressure: 954 mbar (hPa); 28.17 inHg

Overall effects
- Fatalities: 4 total
- Damage: $49.7 million (2022 USD)
- Areas affected: Western Mexico
- IBTrACS /
- Part of the 2022 Pacific hurricane season

Hurricane Roslyn was a powerful tropical cyclone that struck the Pacific coast of Mexico in October 2022. The nineteenth named storm, tenth hurricane, and fourth major hurricane of the 2022 Pacific hurricane season, Roslyn formed on October 20, from an area of low pressure that developed off the southwestern coast of Mexico. The system moved west-northwestward, paralleling the coast, where it became a hurricane at 00:00 UTC, on October 22, and, within 18 hours rapidly intensified to a Category 4 hurricane, with sustained winds of 130 mph (215 km/h). Roslyn made landfall on October 23 near Santa Cruz in northern Nayarit, at 11:20 UTC with 120 mph (195 km/h) winds. Inland, Roslyn weakened quickly to a tropical storm, and then dissipated over east-central Mexico on October 24.

Roslyn prompted the issuance of hurricane and tropical storm watches and warnings by the Mexican government for Western Mexico. More than 270 people evacuated from Roslyn and many activities were suspended. Around 150,000 people lost power and at least 5,000 houses were damaged. Although Roslyn struck the country at high intensity, only 4 people were killed and the hurricane caused nearly a billion peso (US$50 million) of damage.

== Meteorological history ==
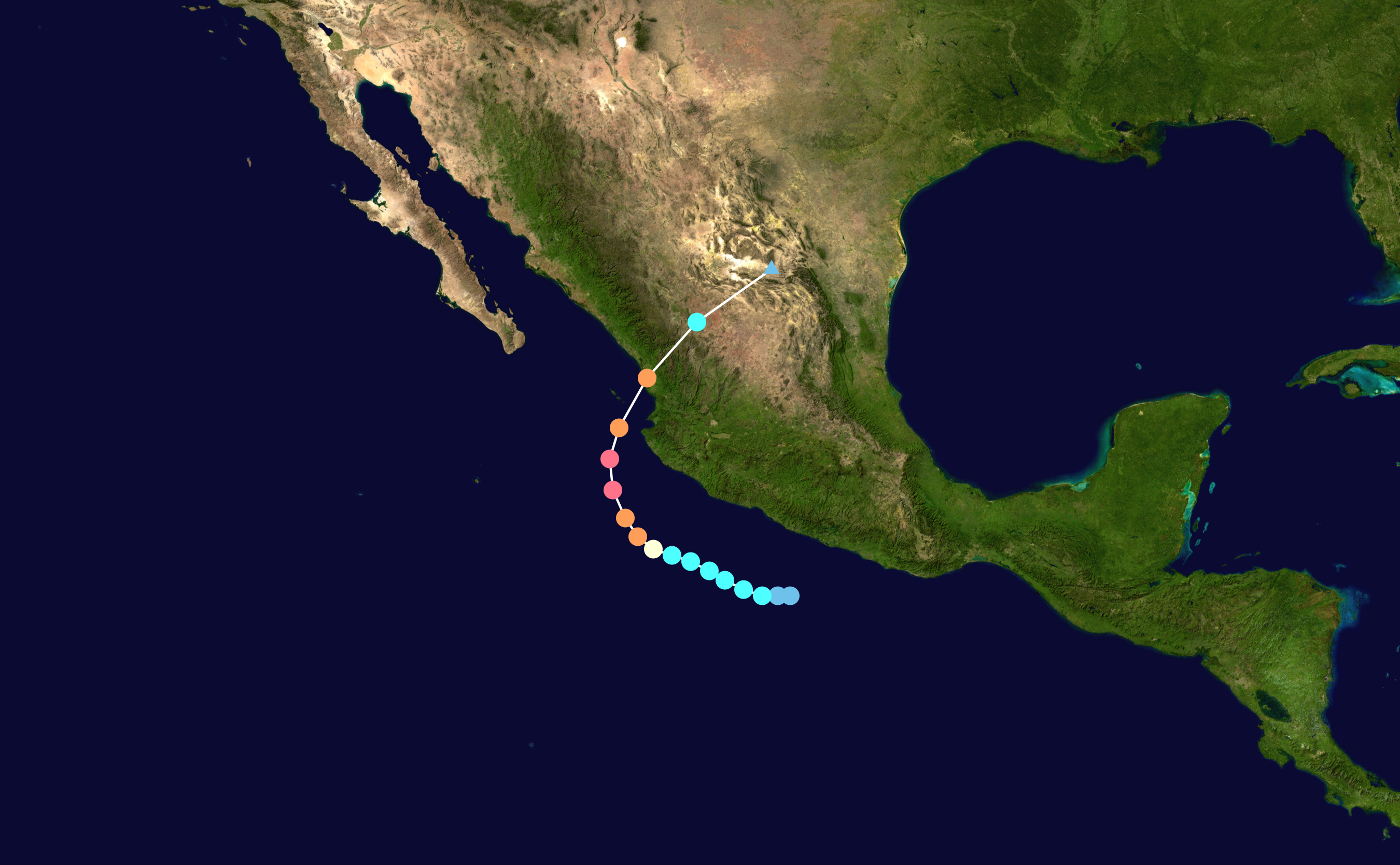
Map plotting the storm's track and intensity, according to the Saffir–Simpson scale Map key Saffir–Simpson scale Tropical depression (≤38 mph, ≤62 km/h) Tropical storm (39–73 mph, 63–118 km/h) Category 1 (74–95 mph, 119–153 km/h) Category 2 (96–110 mph, 154–177 km/h) Category 3 (111–129 mph, 178–208 km/h) Category 4 (130–156 mph, 209–251 km/h) Category 5 (≥157 mph, ≥252 km/h) Unknown Storm type Tropical cyclone Subtropical cyclone Extratropical cyclone, remnant low, tropical disturbance, or monsoon depression

A tropical wave entered the far eastern Pacific basin off the coast of Central America on October 16. The convection within it gradually increased over the next couple of days, and an area of low pressure formed south of the southern coast of Mexico on October 19. Its circulation became better-defined later that day, resulting in the formation of a tropical depression by 00:00 UTC on October 20, about 140 mi (220 km) south-southwest of Acapulco, Guerrero.

The depression, designated Nineteen-E by the National Hurricane Center, strengthened into Tropical Storm Roslyn 12 hours later. The storm steadily strengthened into the following day, tracking west-northwestward over warm near–85 °F (30 °C) waters and experiencing only minimal wind shear. By 15:00 UTC on October 21, a central dense overcast with overshooting tops formed near the storm's center, along with a partial eyewall beneath it. Roslyn became a hurricane eight hours later about 185 mi (295 km) south-southwest of Manzanillo, Colima, and proceeded to rapidly intensify. Roslyn became a Category 3 major hurricane early on October 22, as a well-defined eye became visible in infrared satellite imagery, with cloud tops in the surrounding central dense overcast temperatures as cold as −110 °F (−80 °C). The hurricane turned north-northwestward while continuing to strengthen, and reached peak intensity as a category 4 hurricane with maximum sustained winds of 130 mph (215 km/h) and a minimum central pressure of 954 mbar (28.17 inHg) by 18:00 UTC that day, about 140 mi (220 km) west-southwest of Manzanillo. At 06:00 UTC the next day, Roslyn weakened to Category 3 strength due to increasing south-southwest wind shear. Now accelerating toward the north-northeast, its eye passed between Islas Marías and the coast of mainland Mexico a few hours later.

Roslyn made landfall near Santa Cruz in northern Nayarit at 11:20 UTC with 120 mph (195 km/h) winds. Increasing southwesterly vertical wind shear and interaction with the mountainous terrain of Mexico caused the system to rapidly weaken, becoming a tropical storm later in the day. Then, by 00:00 UTC on October 24, Roslyn degenerated into a remnant low over east-central Mexico, west of Monterrey. Its remaining moisture and upper-level energy were then pulled northward into Texas by an advancing south-central U.S. cold front.

== Preparations, impact, and aftermath ==
Satellite loop of Hurricane Roslyn making landfall in Nayarit and then rapidly weakening on October 23

In anticipation of Roslyn, the government of Mexico issued a hurricane warning for the coast extending from Playa Perula south of Cabo Corrientes, Jalisco, north to Escuinapa Municipality, Sinaloa, and for Las Islas Marias. Furthermore, Officials declared a precautionary alert for Jalisco, Colima, Nayarit, and Sinaloa. In Jalisco, ports were closed, as were schools and tourist venues in coastal municipalities. Several hundred people were evacuated from La Huerta; two shelters were set up in La Huerta along with an additional five in Puerto Vallarta. Officials in Nayarit reported that 3,000 people were evacuated from their homes in the municipalities of Santiago Ixcuintla and San Blas. Statewide, a total of 8,000 homes were damaged along with 8,000 ha (20,000 acres) of farmland. Damages statewide were estimated at Mex$991 million (US$49.7 million).

Cars were submerged and major damage occurred to roofs and outdoor coverings throughout coastal Nayarit. In Tepic, trees were blown down and flooded some streets, and a local highway was blocked after a landslide occurred. At least 5,000 houses were damaged. Four people were killed, including an 80-year-old man who died when a beam from a roof fell on him, and two women from collapsing buildings. Local Civil Protection Chief Adrián Bobadilla, stated that the damage was not significant, quoting "The biggest effect [of the hurricane] was from the waves, on some of the beachside infrastructure [but] we did not have any significant damage". Oyster farmers in Santiago Ixcuintla, however, indicated that the losses were total. Roslyn brought high waves and heavy rainfall to Puerto Vallarta. Around 150,000 people across northern Mexico lost power. In Sinaloa, strong winds knocked down electricity wiring, trees, and poles, leaving many without electricity. Flash floods and power outages were reported in Puerto Vallarta. Governor of Jalisco Enrique Alfaro Ramírez stated that damages from the hurricane were minor.

Plan DN-III-E, a disaster relief and rescue plan, was activated in the states of Jalisco, Sinaloa, Colima and Nayarit. Over Mex$70 million (US$3.51 million) allocated by the government of Mexico for reconstruction in Nayarit. The Mexican Red Cross provided aid to families. The government of Escuinapa sent 5,000 tons, including groceries, pantries to victims of hurricane.

== See also ==
- Weather of 2022
- Tropical cyclones in 2022
- Timeline of the 2022 Pacific hurricane season
- List of Category 4 Pacific hurricanes
- Other storms of the same name
- Hurricane Tico (1983) – Category 4 hurricane which affected the same areas
- Hurricane Kenna (2002) – Category 5 hurricane that had a comparable path
- Hurricane Willa (2018) – Category 5 hurricane that took an almost identical trajectory
- Hurricane Pamela (2021) – Category 1 hurricane which also had a similar track
- Hurricane Orlene (2022) – Category 4 hurricane that hit northwestern Mexico two weeks earlier
- Hurricane Lidia (2023) – Category 4 hurricane that made landfall near Las Penitas, Mexico.
