= List of storms named Roslyn =

The name Roslyn has been used for five tropical cyclones in the Eastern Pacific Ocean.

- Tropical Storm Roslyn (1964) – strong tropical storm that did not impact land
- Hurricane Roslyn (1986) – Category 4 hurricane that made landfall near Mazatlán at Category 1 intensity
- Hurricane Roslyn (1992) – Category 2 hurricane that did not impact land
- Tropical Storm Roslyn (2016) – moderate tropical storm that did not impact land
- Hurricane Roslyn (2022) – Category 4 hurricane that struck Nayarit at Category 3 intensity
