= Timeline of the 2022 Atlantic hurricane season =

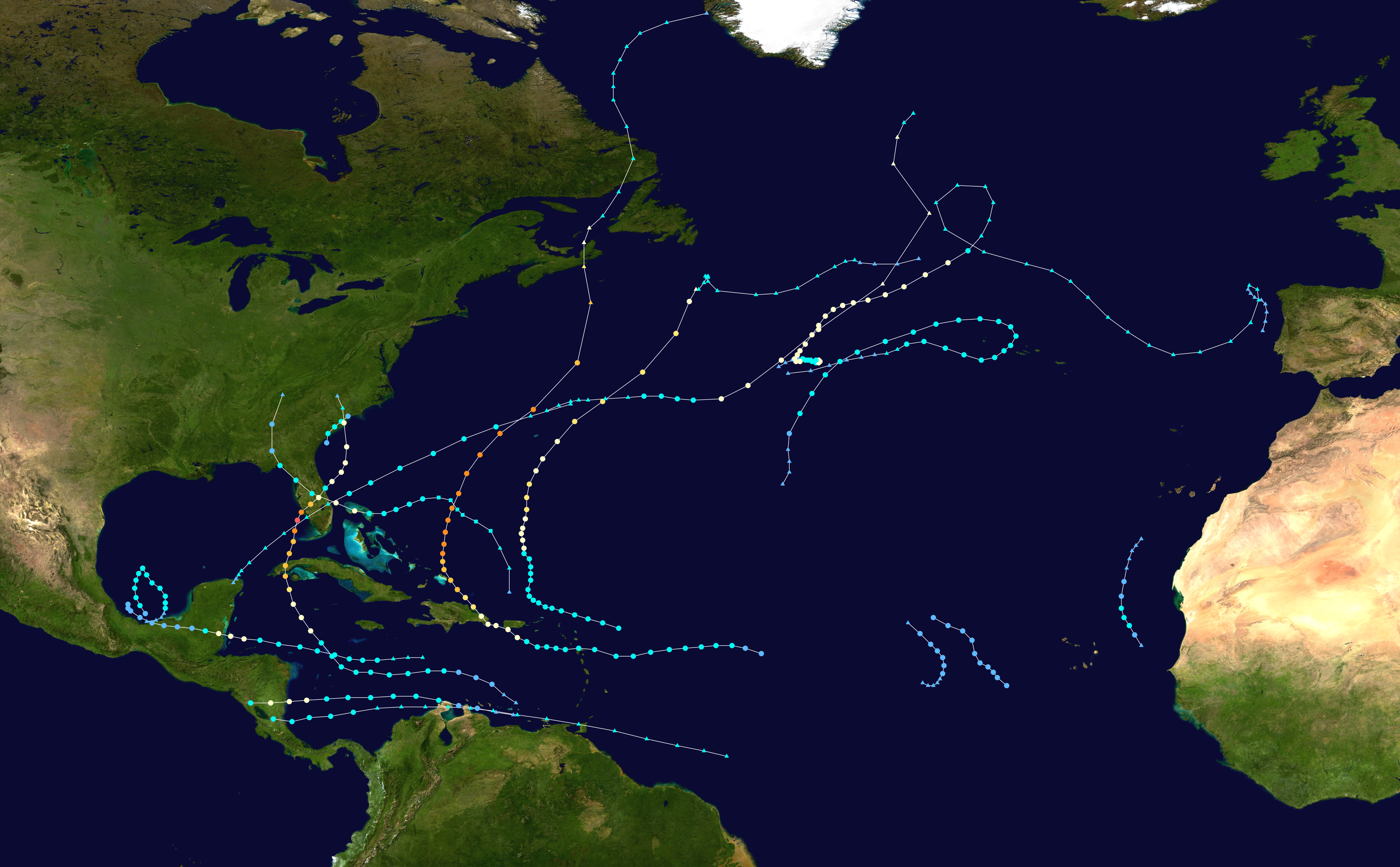
- Season summary map

Season boundaries
- First system formed: June 5, 2022
- Last system dissipated: November 11, 2022

Strongest system
- By maximum sustained winds: Ian
  - Maximum winds: 160 mph (260 km/h) (1-minute sustained)
  - Lowest pressure: 937 mbar (hPa; 27.67 inHg)
- By central pressure: Fiona
  - Maximum winds: 140 mph (220 km/h) (1-minute sustained)
  - Lowest pressure: 931 mbar (hPa; 27.49 inHg)

Longest lasting system
- Name: Fiona
- Duration: 9.75 days
Storm articles
- Tropical Storm Alex (2022)
- Hurricane Bonnie (2022)
- Hurricane Earl (2022)
- Hurricane Fiona
- Hurricane Ian
- Tropical Storm Hermine (2022)
- Hurricane Julia (2022)
- Hurricane Lisa (2022)
- Hurricane Nicole (2022)

The 2022 Atlantic hurricane season saw an average number of named storms and hurricanes, and below average number major hurricanes (category 3 or higher on the 5-level Saffir–Simpson wind speed scale). There were fourteen named storms during the season; eight of them strengthened into a hurricane, and two of those reached major hurricane intensity. The season officially began on June 1, and ended on November 30. These dates, adopted by convention, historically describe the period in each year when most subtropical or tropical cyclogenesis occurs in the Atlantic Ocean. No subtropical or tropical development occurred in the Atlantic prior to the start of the season, making this the first since 2014 not to have a pre-season named storm. The season's first storm, Tropical Storm Alex, formed on June 5, and the last, Hurricane Nicole, dissipated on November 11.

Tropical cyclone formation ceased for several weeks beginning in early July, and for the first time since 1941 there were no named storm in the Atlantic basin between July 3 and August 30. This season, two systems, Bonnie and Julia, survived the crossover between the Atlantic and Pacific basins. The season's largest and most powerful hurricanes were Fiona and Ian. Fiona brought heavy flooding, significant damage, and loss of life along its path from the Lesser Antilles to Eastern Canada. Ian made landfall in Western Cuba and in Florida, where it hit at Category 4 strength, causing massive storm surge and flooding, along with widespread destruction.

This timeline documents tropical cyclone formations, strengthening, weakening, landfalls, extratropical transitions, and dissipations during the season. It includes information that was not released throughout the season, meaning that data from post-storm reviews by the National Hurricane Center, such as a storm that was not initially warned upon, has been included.

The time stamp for each event is first stated using Coordinated Universal Time (UTC), the 24-hour clock where 00:00 = midnight UTC. The NHC uses both UTC and the time zone where the center of the tropical cyclone is currently located. The time zones utilized (east to west) are: Greenwich, Cape Verde, Atlantic, Eastern, and Central. In this timeline, the respective area time is included in parentheses. Additionally, figures for maximum sustained winds and position estimates are rounded to the nearest 5 units (miles, or kilometers), following National Hurricane Center practice. Direct wind observations are rounded to the nearest whole number. Atmospheric pressures are listed to the nearest millibar and nearest hundredth of an inch of mercury.

== Timeline ==
=== June ===
June 1

- The 2022 Atlantic hurricane season officially begins.

June 5

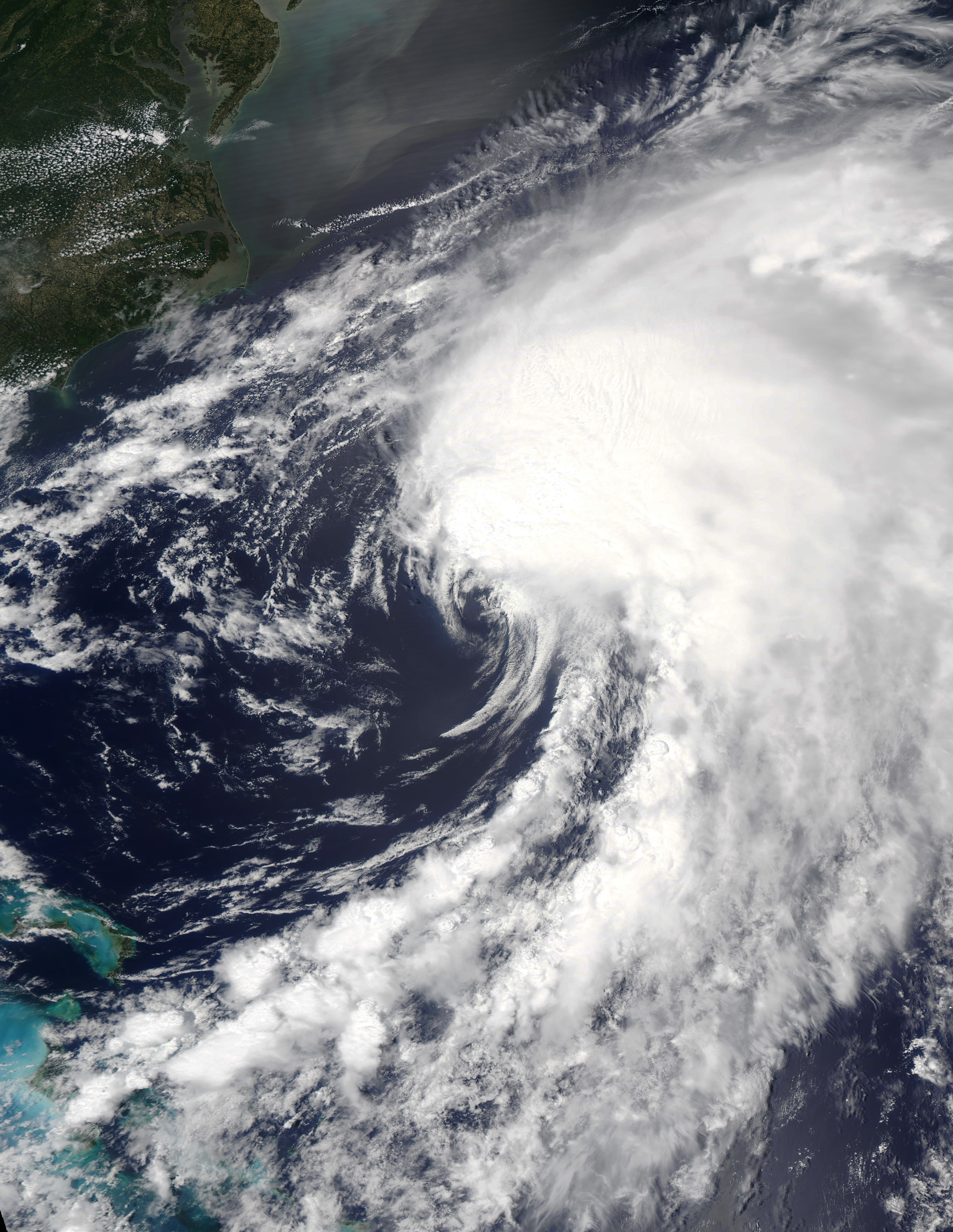
Tropical Storm Alex at peak intensity west of Bermuda on June 5

- 00:00 UTC (8:00 p.m. EDT, June 4) at 28.0°N 78.8°W – Tropical Storm Alex forms from a low-pressure system about 85 mi (140 km) north of Grand Bahama Island. (Note: Due to the threat the developing system posed to Cuba and Florida, the National Hurricane Center initiated advisories on it, designating it Potential Tropical Cyclone One at 21:00 UTC (4:00 p.m. CDT) on June 2.)
- 18:00 UTC (2:00 p.m. EDT) at 31.0°N 72.5°W – Tropical Storm Alex reaches its peak sustained winds of 70 mph (110 km/h) about 345 mi (555 km) south-southeast of Cape Hatteras, North Carolina.

June 6

- 00:00 UTC (8:00 p.m. AST, June 5) at 32.1°N 70.2°W – Tropical Storm Alex reaches a minimum central pressure of 984 mbar (29.06 inHg) about 320 mi (520 km) west of Bermuda.
- 12:00 UTC (8:00 a.m. AST) at 33.8°N 65.2°W – Tropical Storm Alex transitions to a post-tropical cyclone about 105 mi (165 km) north-northwest of Bermuda, and is later absorbed within a baroclinic zone.

=== July ===
July 1

- 06:00 UTC (2:00 a.m. EDT) at 11.6°N 78.5°W – Tropical Storm Bonnie forms from a tropical wave about 230 mi (370 km) east-southeast of San Andres Island, Colombia. (Note: Due to the threat the developing system posed to the southern Windward Islands, the National Hurricane Center initiated advisories on it, designating it Potential Tropical Cyclone Two at 21:00 UTC (5:00 p.m. AST) on June 27.)
- 18:00 UTC (2:00 p.m. EDT) at 31.8°N 80.5°W – A tropical depression forms from a low-pressure system about 35 mi (55 km) east-southeast of Savannah, Georgia.
- 23:30 UTC (7:30 p.m. EDT) at 32.4°N 80.5°W – The tropical depression strengthens into Tropical Storm Colin as it makes landfall near Hunting Island, South Carolina, while simultaneously reaching peak intensity with maximum sustained winds of 40 mph (65 km/h) and a minimum central pressure of 1011 mbar (29.85 inHg).

July 2

- 03:00 UTC (11:00 p.m. EDT, July 1) at 11.0°N 83.8°W – Tropical Storm Bonnie makes landfall in southern Nicaragua, about 10 mi (20 km) northwest of the Costa Rica–Nicaragua border with sustained winds of 60 mph (95 km/h). (Note: This was Bonnie's peak sustained wind speed while in the Atlantic basin.)
- 12:00 UTC (7:00 a.m. CDT) at 11.2°N 85.9°W – Tropical Storm Bonnie moves offshore into the Pacific Ocean about 60 mi (95 km) southeast of Managua, Nicaragua, exiting the Atlantic basin.
- 18:00 UTC (2:00 p.m. EDT) at 33.8°N 78.9°W – Tropical Storm Colin weakens to a tropical depression inland and later dissipates over northeastern South Carolina.

=== August ===
- No tropical cyclones form in the basin during the month of August. (Note: At 21:00 UTC on August 19, the National Hurricane Center initiated advisories on a disturbance over the Bay of Campeche due to the threat it posed to the Gulf coast of northeastern Mexico, designating it Potential Tropical Cyclone Four. The last advisory on the system was issued at 03:00 UTC on August 21, after the disturbance moved inland and it became evident that it would not become a tropical cyclone or bring sustained tropical-storm-force winds to the Mexico or Texas coasts.)

=== September ===
September 1

- 06:00 UTC (2:00 a.m. AST) at 38.1°N 45.2°W – Tropical Depression Five forms from an area of low pressure about 715 mi (1,150 km) southeast of Cape Race, Newfoundland.
- 12:00 UTC (12:00 p.m. GMT) at 38.1°N 44.8°W – Tropical Depression Five strengthens into Tropical Storm Danielle west of the Azores.

September 2

- 12:00 UTC (12:00 p.m. GMT) at 37.8°N 43.6°W – Tropical Storm Danielle strengthens into a Category 1 hurricane about 680 mi (1,095 km) west of Flores Island in the Azores.
- 18:00 UTC (2:00 p.m. AST, September 2) at 17.9°N 58.6°W – Tropical Storm Earl forms from a tropical wave about 295 mi (470 km) east of the northern Leeward Islands.

September 3

- 06:00 UTC (6:00 a.m. GMT) at 38.0°N 43.8°W – Hurricane Danielle weakens to a tropical storm west of Flores Island.

September 4

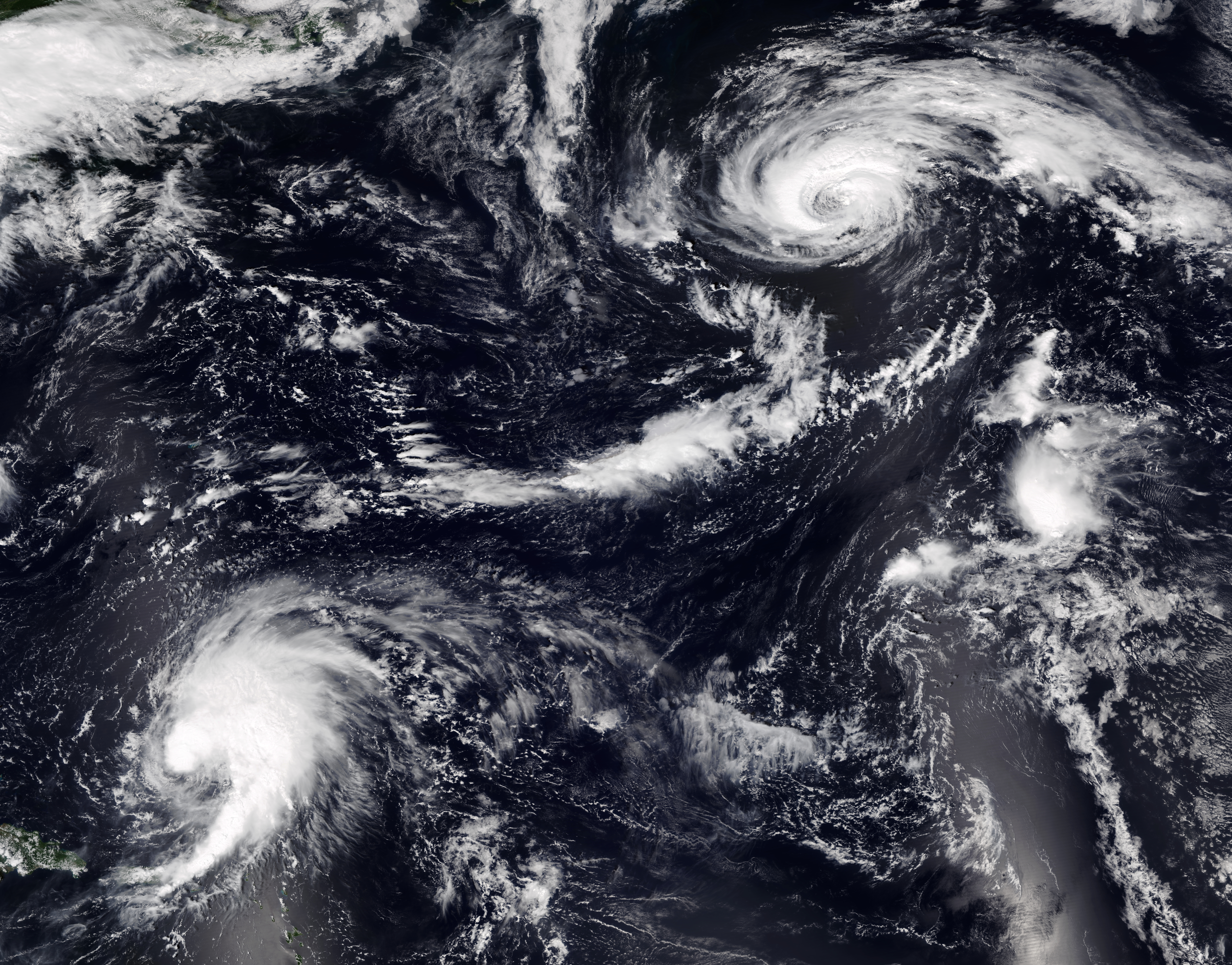
Tropical Storm Earl (bottom left) and Hurricane Danielle (top right) on September 5

- 00:00 UTC (8:00 p.m. AST, September 3) at 37.9°N 45.0°W – Tropical Storm Danielle re-strengthens into a Category 1 hurricane west of Flores Island.
- 18:00 UTC (6:00 p.m. AST) at 38.4°N 45.2°W – Hurricane Danielle attains maximum sustained winds of 85 mph (140 km/h) about 760 mi (1,220 km) west of Flores Island.
- 18:00 UTC (2:00 p.m. AST) at 23.9°N 65.7°W – Tropical Storm Earl intensifies into a Category 1 hurricane about 580 mi (935 km) south of Bermuda.

September 7

- 12:00 UTC (12:00 p.m. GMT) at 43.5°N 37.2°W – Hurricane Danielle attains a minimum barometric pressure of 972 mbar (28.70 inHg).

September 8

- 00:00 UTC (8:00 p.m. AST, September 7) at 26.8°N 65.5°W – Hurricane Earl intensifies into a Category 2 hurricane about 390 mi (630 km) south of Bermuda.
- 06:00 UTC (6:00 a.m. GMT) at 46.2°N 32.4°W – Hurricane Danielle weakens to a tropical storm north of Flores Island.
- 12:00 UTC (12:00 p.m. GMT) at 47.3°N 31.4°W – Tropical Storm Danielle transitions into an extratropical cyclone about 540 mi (870 km) north of Flores Island, and subsequently dissipates.
- 18:00 UTC (2:00 p.m. AST) at 29.7°N 64.8°W – Hurricane Earl weakens to a Category 1 hurricane about 180 mi (285 km) south of Bermuda.

September 9

- 12:00 UTC (8:00 a.m. AST) at 33.4°N 61.9°W – Hurricane Earl re-strengthens to a Category 2 hurricane about 180 mi (285 km) east-northeast of Bermuda.

September 10

- 00:00 UTC (8:00 p.m. AST, September 9) at 37.1°N 56.8°W – Hurricane Earl attains peak intensity with maximum sustained winds of 110 mph (175 km/h) and a minimum barometric pressure of 948 mbar (27.99 inHg) several hundred miles southeast of Nova Scotia.
- 12:00 UTC (8:00 a.m. AST) at 42.4°N 53.3°W – Hurricane Earl weakens to a Category 1 hurricane about 295 mi (470 km) south of the Avalon Peninsula of Newfoundland.
- 18:00 UTC (2:00 p.m. AST) at 43.3°N 52.8°W – Hurricane Earl transitions into a hurricane-force post-tropical cyclone about 235 mi (380 km) south of the Avalon Peninsula, and was subsequently absorbed by a mid-latitude low.

September 14

- 06:00 UTC (2:00 a.m. AST) at 16.0°N 47.9°W – Tropical Depression Seven forms about 890 mi (1,435 km) east of Guadeloupe.
- 18:00 UTC (2:00 p.m. AST) at 16.6°N 50.1°W–Tropical Depression Seven strengthens into Tropical Storm Fiona about 750 mi (1,205 km) east of Guadeloupe.

September 16

- 23:15 UTC (7:15 p.m. AST) at 16.4°N 61.4°W – Tropical Storm Fiona makes landfall in Guadeloupe.°

September 18

- 12:00 UTC (8:00 a.m. AST) at 17.2°N 66.2°W – Tropical Storm Fiona strengthens into a Category 1 hurricane about 60 mi (100 km) south-southeast of Ponce, Puerto Rico.
- 19:20 UTC (3:20 p.m. AST) at 18.0°N 67.1°W – Hurricane Fiona makes landfall near Punta Tocon, Puerto Rico. about 15 mi (25 km) south-southeast of Mayaguez, with maximum sustained winds of 85 mph (140 km/h).

September 19

- 07:30 UTC (3:30 a.m. AST) at 18.4°N 68.5°W – Hurricane Fiona makes landfall near Boca de Yuma, Dominican Republic, with maximum sustained winds of 90 mph (150 km/h).
- 18:00 UTC (2:00 p.m. AST) at 19.5°N 69.5°W – Hurricane Fiona intensifies into a Category 2 hurricane about 165 mi (270 km) southeast of Grand Turk Island.

September 20

- 06:00 UTC (2:00 a.m. EDT) at 20.8°N 70.7°W – Hurricane Fiona intensifies into a Category 3 hurricane about 45 mi (75 km) south-southeast of Grand Turk.
- 11:00 UTC (7:00 a.m. AST) at 21.4°N 71.1°W – Hurricane Fiona makes landfall on Grand Turk with sustained winds of 115 mph (185 km/h).
- 12:00 UTC (8:00 a.m. AST) at 32.5°N 45.8°W – Tropical Depression Eight forms about 1,105 mi (1,780 km) east of Bermuda.
- 18:00 UTC (2:00 p.m. AST) at 34.0°N 45.0°W – Tropical Depression Eight strengthens into Tropical Storm Gaston.

September 21

- 06:00 UTC (2:00 a.m. EDT) at 23.5°N 71.8°W – Hurricane Fiona intensifies into a Category 4 hurricane and simultaneously attains maximum sustained winds of 140 mph (220 km/h) about 150 mi (240 km) north-northwest of Grand Turk.

September 22

- 18:00 UTC (6:00 p.m. GMT) at 41.0°N 33.1°W – Tropical Storm Gaston attains peak intensity with maximum sustained winds of 65 mph (100 km/h) and a minimum barometric pressure of 994 mbar (29.35 inHg) about 665 mi (1,075 km) west-southwest of Flores Island in the Azores.

September 23

Satellite loop of Hurricane Fiona passing between Bermuda and the U.S. Atlantic seaboard on the morning of September 23

- 00:00 UTC (8:00 p.m. AST, September 22) at 30.9°N 69.0°W – Hurricane Fiona attains a minimum barometric pressure of 931 mbar (27.49 inHg) about 275 mi (445 km) west-southwest of Bermuda.
- 06:00 UTC (2:00 a.m. AST) at 13.7°N 68.1°W – Tropical Depression Nine forms from a tropical wave about 150 mi (240 km) east-northeast of Aruba.
- 12:00 UTC (11:00 a.m. CVT) at 17.4°N 19.9°W – Tropical Depression Ten forms from a tropical wave about 290 mi (465 km) east-northeast of the Cabo Verde Islands.
- 18:00 UTC (2:00 p.m. AST) at 37.8°N 61.7°W – Hurricane Fiona weakens to a Category 3 hurricane 485 mi (780 km) south of Halifax, Nova Scotia.
- 18:00 UTC (5:00 p.m. CVT) at 18.1°N 20.3°W – Tropical Depression Ten strengthens into Tropical Storm Hermine and attains peak intensity with maximum sustained winds of 40 mph (65 km/h) and a minimum barometric pressure of 1003 mbar (29.62 inHg) northeast of the Cabo Verde Islands.

September 24

- 00:00 UTC (8:00 p.m. AST, September 23) at 42.3°N 60.7°W – Hurricane Fiona transitions into an extratropical cyclone with 115 mph (185 km/h) winds about 220 mi (350 km) southeast of Halifax, and dissipates three days later. (Note: Extratropical Cyclone Fiona made landfall near Whitehead, Nova Scotia at 07:00 UTC (3:00 a.m. AST) on September 24, with winds of 100 mph (155 km/h). Later, while weakening, post-tropical Fiona made landfall near L'Anse-du-Portage. Saint-Augustin Municipality, Côte-Nord, Quebec, at 08:00 UTC (4:00 a.m. AST) on September 25, with winds of 50 mph (85 km/h).)
- 00:00 UTC (8:00 p.m. EDT, September 23) at 14.7°N 71.7°W – Tropical Depression Nine strengthens into Tropical Storm Ian about 385 mi (620 km) southeast of Jamaica.
- 12:00 UTC (11:00 a.m. CVT) at 20.3°N 20.9°W – Tropical Storm Hermine weakens to a tropical depression about 355 mi (575 km) northeast of the Cabo Verde Islands.

September 25

- 00:00 UTC (11:00 p.m. CVT, September 24) at 22.4°N 20.5°W – Tropical Depression Hermine degenerates to a post-tropical remnant low about 470 mi (760 km) south-southwest of the Canary Islands.

September 26

- 00:00 UTC (12:00 a.m. GMT) at 38.8°N 37.7°W – Tropical Storm Gaston transitions into a post-tropical cyclone, and subsequently dissipates.
- 06:00 UTC (2:00 a.m. EDT) at 17.7°N 81.7°W – Tropical Storm Ian strengthens into a Category 1 hurricane about 115 mi (185 km) south-southwest of Grand Cayman.

September 27

- 00:00 UTC (8:00 p.m. EDT) at 20.8°N 83.3°W – Hurricane Ian strengthens into a Category 2 hurricane about 130 mi (205 km) southeast of the western tip of Cuba.
- 06:00 UTC (2:00 a.m. EDT) at 21.8°N 83.6°W – Hurricane Ian strengthens into a Category 3 hurricane about 30 mi (45 km) south of La Coloma, Pinar del Río, Cuba.
- 08:30 UTC (4:30 a.m. EDT) at 22.2°N 83.7°W – Hurricane Ian makes landfall near La Coloma with sustained winds of 125 mph (205 km/h).

September 28

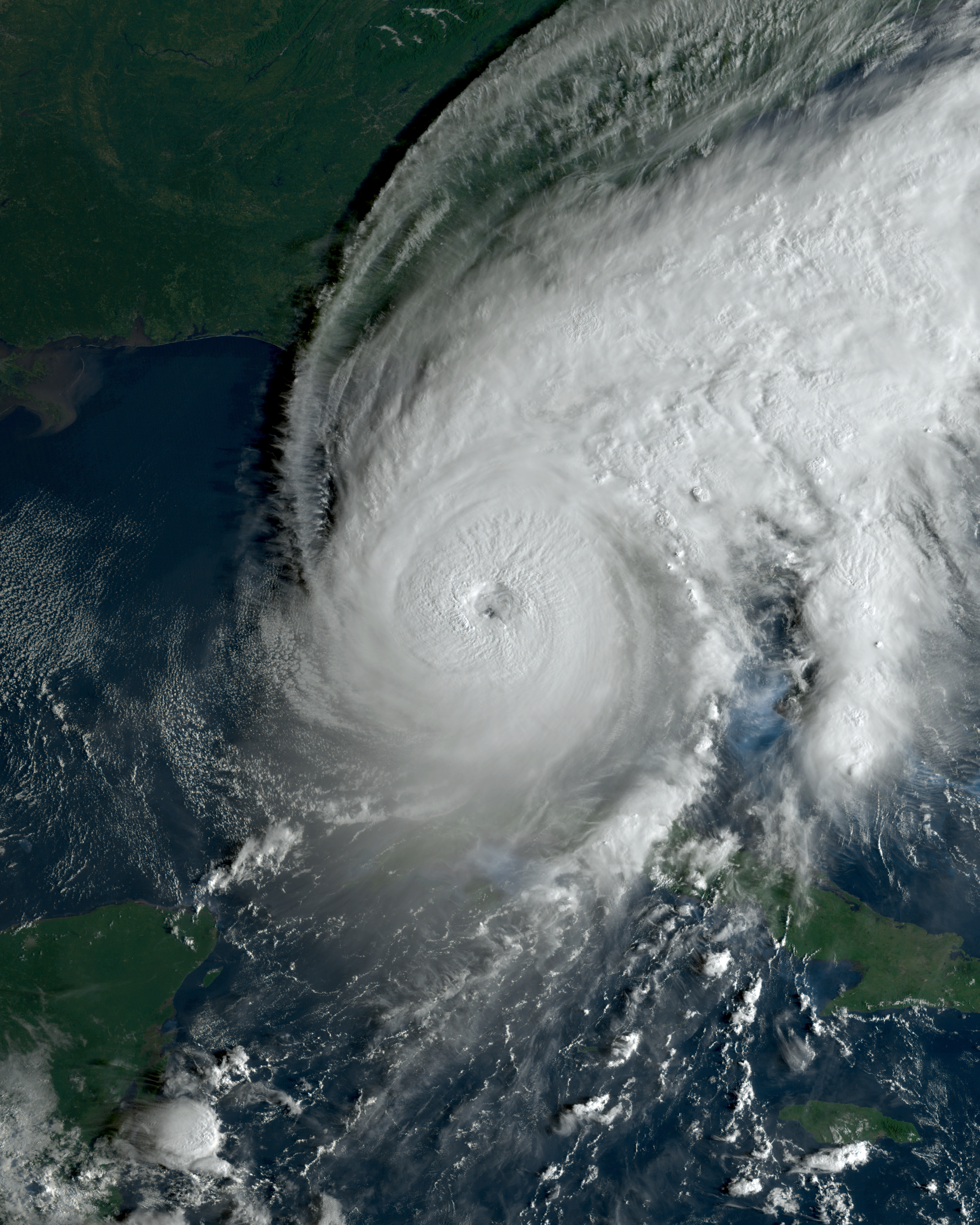
Hurricane Ian at near peak intensity approaching southwest Florida on September 28

- 00:00 UTC (8:00 p.m. AST, September 27) at 14.5°N 34.3°W – Tropical Depression Eleven forms about 605 mi (970 km) west of the Cabo Verde Islands.
- 02:00 UTC (10:00 p.m. EDT, September 27) at 24.6°N 82.9°W – Hurricane Ian makes landfall on Dry Tortugas in the Florida Keys with sustained winds of 125 mph (205 km/h).
- 06:00 UTC (2:00 a.m. EDT) at 25.2°N 82.9°W – Hurricane Ian intensifies into a Category 4 hurricane.
- 12:00 UTC (8:00 a.m. EDT) at 26.0°N 82.7°W – Hurricane Ian intensifies into a Category 5 hurricane and simultaneously attains peak intensity with maximum sustained winds of 160 mph (260 km/h) and a minimum barometric pressure of 937 mbar (27.67 inHg) about 55 mi (90 km) west of Naples, Florida.
- 18:00 UTC (2:00 p.m. EDT) at 26.6°N 82.4°W – Hurricane Ian weakens to a Category 4 hurricane.
- 19:05 UTC (3:05 p.m. EDT) at 26.7°N 82.2°W – Hurricane Ian makes landfall at Cayo Costa Island, Florida, with sustained winds of 150 mph (240 km/h).
- 20:35 UTC (4:35 p.m. EDT) at 26.8°N 82.0°W – Hurricane Ian makes landfall on mainland Florida near Punta Gorda, with sustained winds of 145 mph (230 km/h).

September 29

- 00:00 UTC (8:00 p.m. EDT, September 28) at 27.2°N 81.7°W – Hurricane Ian weakens to a Category 3 hurricane inland about 30 mi (50 km) northeast of Punta Gorda.
- 06:00 UTC (2:00 a.m. EDT) at 27.7°N 81.1°W – Hurricane Ian weakens to a Category 1 hurricane inland about 55 mi (90 km) south-southeast of Orlando, Florida.
- 12:00 UTC (8:00 a.m. EDT) at 28.4°N 80.6°W – Hurricane Ian weakens to a tropical storm while emerging over the Atlantic Ocean near Cape Canaveral, Florida.
- 12:00 UTC (8:00 a.m. AST) at 18.3°N 36.9°W – Tropical Depression Eleven degenerates into a post-tropical remnant low about 805 mi (1,295 km) west of the Cabo Verde Islands.
- 18:00 UTC (2:00 p.m. EDT) at 28.9°N 80.1°W – Tropical Storm Ian re-strengthens into a Category 1 hurricane about 45 mi (75 km) northeast of Cape Canaveral.

September 30

- 06:00 UTC (2:00 a.m. EDT) at 30.3°N 79.1°W – Hurricane Ian attains its secondary peak strength with maximum sustained winds of 85 mph (140 km/h).
- 18:05 UTC (2:05 p.m. EDT) at 33.3°N 79.2°W – Hurricane Ian makes landfall near Georgetown, South Carolina with sustained winds of 80 mph (130 km/h).

=== October ===
October 1

- 00:00 UTC (8:00 p.m. EDT, September 30) at 34.4°N 79.3°W – Hurricane Ian weakens to a tropical storm inland and transitions to an extratropical cyclone about 70 mi (110 km) north of Georgetown, and later dissipates.

October 4

- 12:00 UTC (8:00 a.m. AST) at 13.6°N 29.5°W – Tropical Depression Twelve forms from a tropical wave about 450 mi (720 km) west-southwest of the Cabo Verde Island.

October 7

- 00:00 UTC (8:00 p.m. AST, October 6) at 18.7°N 35.0°W – Tropical Depression Twelve opens into a surface trough about 750 mi (1,205 km) west-northwest of the Cabo Verde Islands.
- 00:00 UTC (8:00 p.m. AST, October 6) at 11.9°N 69.2°W – Tropical Depression Thirteen forms from a tropical wave about 25 mi (40 km) southwest of Curaçao. (Note: Due to the threat the developing system posed to the portions of the northern coast of South America, the National Hurricane Center initiated advisories on it, designating it Potential Tropical Cyclone Thirteen at 15:00 UTC (11:00 a.m. AST) on October 6.)
- 03:00 UTC (11:00 p.m. AST, October 6) at 12.0°N 69.8°W – Tropical Depression Thirteen makes landfall near Adicora, Venezuela.
- 08:30 UTC (4:30 a.m. AST) at 12.2°N 71.2°W – Tropical Depression Thirteen makes landfall near Punta Espada, Colombia.
- 12:00 UTC (8:00 a.m. AST) at 12.5°N 72.1°W – Tropical Depression Thirteen strengthens into Tropical Storm Julia about 30 mi (45 km) west of the northern tip of the Guajira Peninsula.

October 9

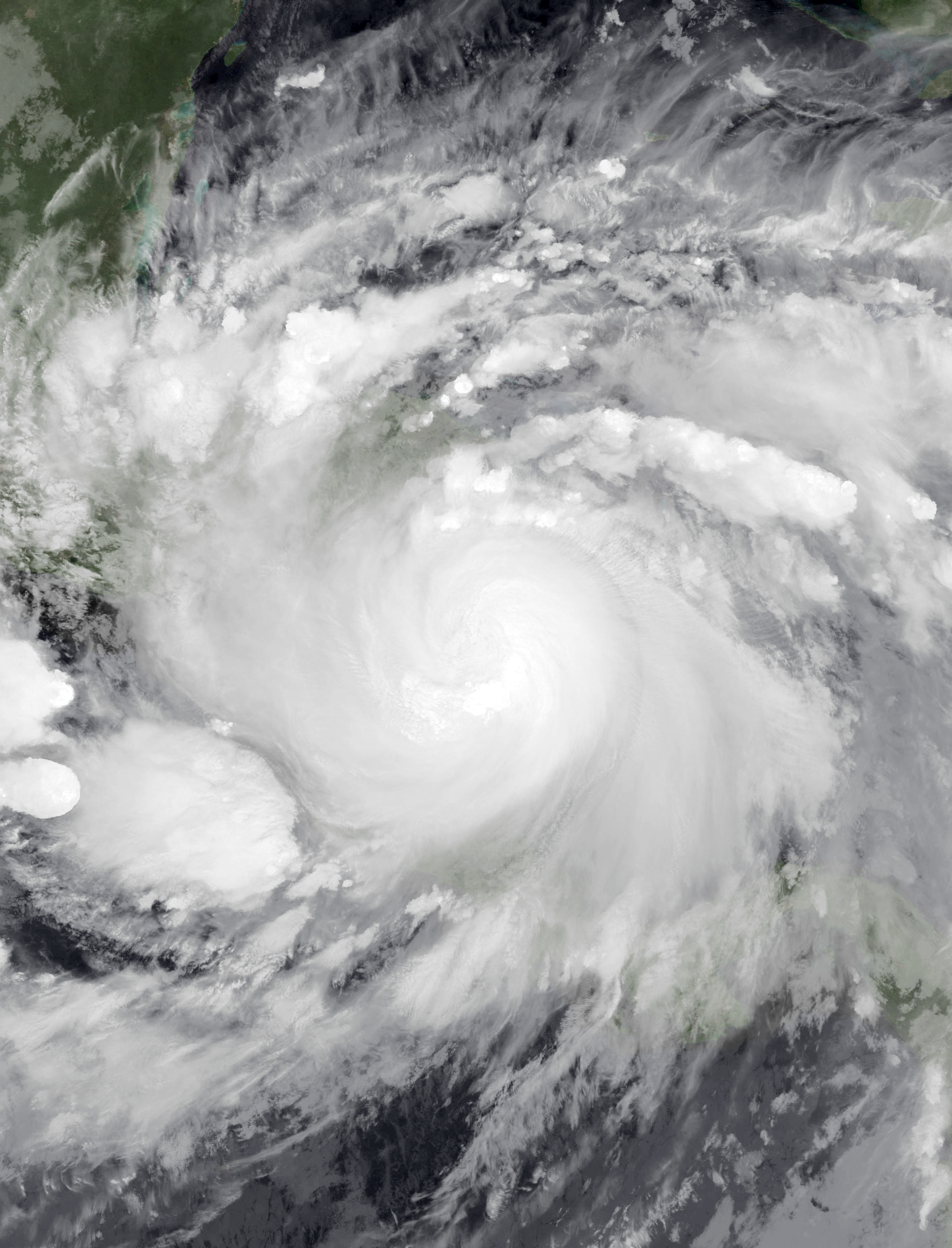
Hurricane Julia making landfall in Nicaragua on October 9

- 00:00 UTC (8:00 p.m. EDT, October 8) at 12.5°N 82.0°W – Tropical Storm Julia strengthens into a Category 1 hurricane about 80 mi (130 km) east of the coast of Nicaragua, 20 mi (30 km) west-southeast of San Andres Island, Colombia.
- 06:00 UTC (2:00 a.m. EDT) at 12.4°N 83.3°W – Hurricane Julia attains peak intensity with maximum sustained winds of 85 mph (140 km/h) and a minimum barometric pressure of 982 mbar (29.00 inHg), about 45 mi (75 km) northeast of Bluefields, Nicaragua.
- 07:15 UTC (3:15 a.m. EDT) at 12.4°N 83.6°W – Hurricane Julia makes landfall near Laguna de Perlas, Nicaragua, north of Bluefields, at peak intensity.
- 18:00 UTC (1:00 p.m. CDT) at 12.3°N 86.2°W – Hurricane Julia weakens to a tropical storm inland about 15 mi (25 km) north-northeast of Managua, Nicaragua, and exits the Atlantic basin a few hours later.

October 11

- 12:00 UTC (7:00 a.m. CDT) at 19.0°N 94.1°W – A tropical depression forms about 70 mi (110 km) north-northeast of Coatzacoalcos, Veracruz.
- 18:00 UTC (1:00 p.m. CDT) at 19.6°N 94.5°W – The tropical depression strengthens into Tropical Storm Karl.

October 12

- 18:00 UTC (1:00 p.m. CDT) at 22.0°N 94.5°W – Tropical Storm Karl attains maximum sustained winds of 60 mph (95 km/h) about 215 mi (345 km) east of Tampico, Tamaulipas.

October 14

- 06:00 UTC (1:00 a.m. CDT) at 20.3°N 92.6°W – Tropical Storm Karl attains a minimum barometric pressure of 997 mbar (29.44 inHg).

October 15

- 00:00 UTC (7:00 p.m. CDT, October 14) at 19.0°N 92.7°W – Tropical Storm Karl degenerates into a remnant low about 65 mi (100 km) west-northwest of Ciudad del Carmen, Campeche, and later dissipates.

October 31

- 12:00 UTC (8:00 a.m. EDT) at 15.5°N 76.7°W – Tropical Storm Lisa forms from a tropical wave about 175 mi (280 km) south of Kingston, Jamaica. (Note: Due to the threat the developing system posed to land areas in the central Caribbean, the National Hurricane Center initiated advisories on it, designating it Potential Tropical Cyclone Fifteen at 21:00 UTC (5:00 p.m. EDT) on October 30.)

=== November ===
November 1

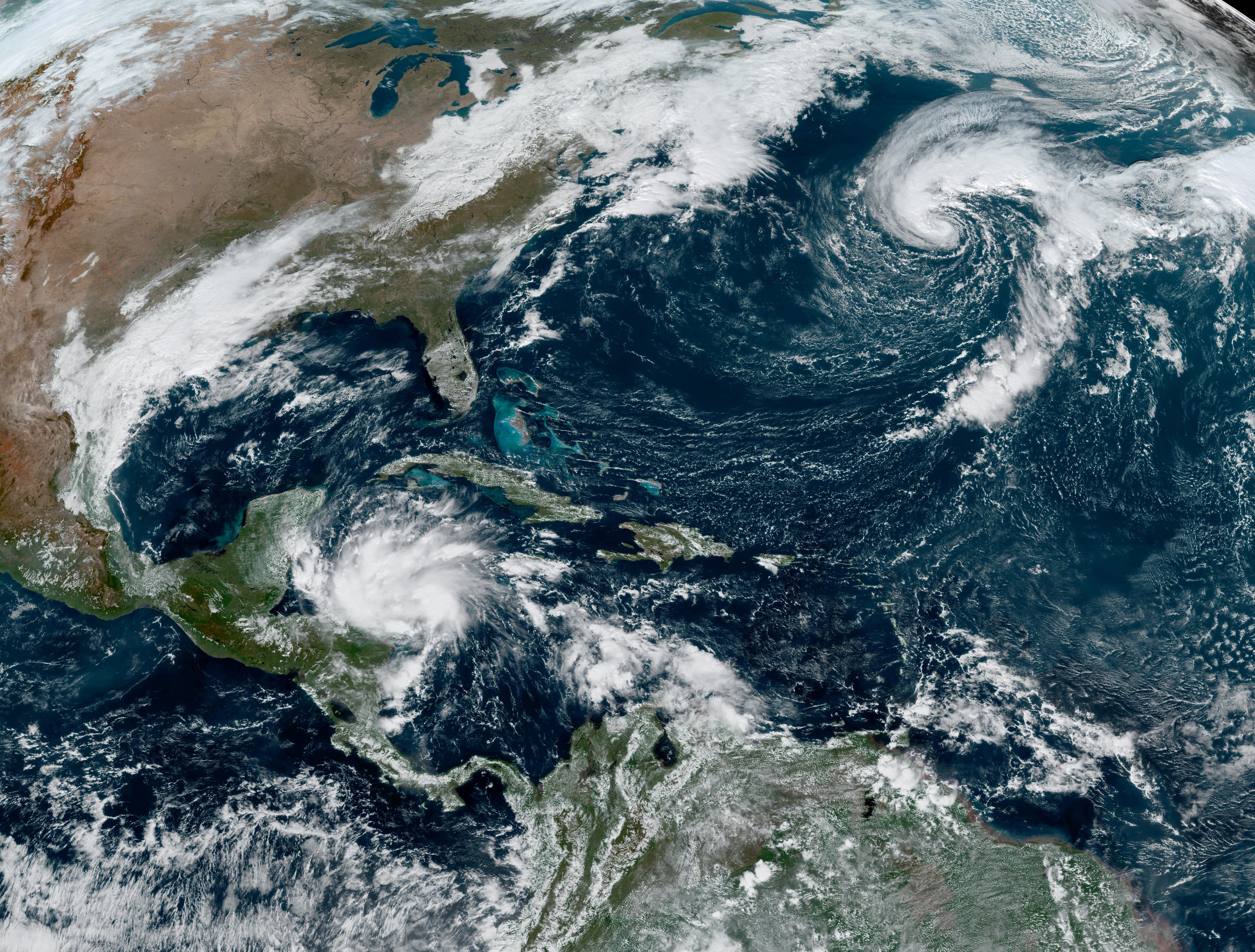
Tropical Storm Lisa (center left) and Tropical Storm Martin (upper right) on November 1

- 12:00 UTC (8:00 a.m. AST) at 35.3°N 56.7°W – Tropical Storm Martin forms from an extratropical cyclone about 550 mi (890 km) east-northeast of Bermuda.

November 2

- 12:00 UTC (7:00 a.m. CDT) at 17.1°N 86.7°W – Tropical Storm Lisa strengthens into a Category 1 hurricane about 140 mi (220 km) east of the coast of Belize.
- 12:00 UTC (8:00 a.m. AST) at 35.1°N 50.9°W – Tropical Storm Martin strengthens into a Category 1 hurricane about 790 mi (1,270 km) south-southeast of Cape Race, Newfoundland.
- 21:30 UTC (4:30 p.m. CDT) at 17.4°N 88.3°W – Hurricane Lisa attains peak intensity with maximum sustained winds of 90 mph (150 km/h) and a minimum barometric pressure of 985 mbar (29.09 inHg) as it makes landfall near the mouth of the Sibun River, about 10 mi (20 km) southwest of Belize City.

November 3

- 06:00 UTC (1:00 a.m. CDT) at 17.7°N 89.6°W – Hurricane Lisa weakens to a tropical storm inland over Central America.
- 06:00 UTC (6:00 a.m. GMT) at 40.3°N 43.6°W – Hurricane Martin attains peak intensity as a tropical cyclone with maximum sustained winds of 85 mph (140 km/h) and a minimum barometric pressure of 965 mbar (28.50 inHg).
- 12:00 UTC (7:00 a.m. CDT) at 17.9°N 90.6°W – Tropical Storm Lisa weakens to a tropical depression inland near the northwestern Guatemala–Mexico border.
- 12:00 UTC (12:00 p.m. GMT) at 43.7°N 38.8°W – Hurricane Martin transitions into a post-tropical cyclone about 730 mi (1,175 km) east of Cape Race, and subsequently became absorbed by a developing extratropical cyclone.

November 5

- 12:00 UTC (7:00 a.m. CDT) at 19.7°N 95.4°W – Tropical Depression Lisa degenerates into a trough about 105 mi (165 km) northeast of Veracruz, Veracruz.

November 7

- 06:00 UTC (2:00 a.m. AST) at 25.2°N 68.2°W – Subtropical Storm Nicole forms about 540 mi (870 km) south-southwest of Bermuda.

November 8

- 18:00 UTC (1:00 p.m. EST) at 27.6°N 73.3°W – Subtropical Storm Nicole transitions into a tropical storm about 580 mi (935 km) east-northeast of Nassau, Bahamas.

November 9

Hurricane Nicole approaching and making landfall on the east coast of Florida on November 10

- 17:00 UTC (12:00 p.m. EST) at 26.5°N 77.1°W – Tropical Storm Nicole makes landfall at Marsh Harbour, Great Abaco Island, Bahamas, with sustained winds of 70 mph (110 km/h).
- 23:00 UTC (6:00 p.m. EST) at 26.6°N 78.2°W – Tropical Storm Nicole strengthens into a Category 1 hurricane and simultaneously attains peak intensity with sustained winds of 75 mph (120 km/h) and a minimum barometric pressure of 980 mbar (28.94 inHg) as it makes landfall on Grand Bahama Island, Bahamas, about 40 mi (65 km) east-northeast of Freeport.

November 10

- 07:45 UTC (2:45 a.m. EST) at 27.6°N 80.3°W – Hurricane Nicole makes landfall at Vero Beach, Florida, with sustained winds of 75 mph (120 km/h).
- 12:00 UTC (7:00 a.m. EST) at 28.0°N 81.6°W – Hurricane Nicole weakens to a tropical storm inland over central Florida between Orlando and Tampa.
- 19:00 UTC (2:00 p.m. EST) at 29.2°N 83.0°W – Tropical Storm Nicole makes landfall at Cedar Key with sustained winds of 45 mph (75 km/h) after briefly emerging over the Gulf of Mexico.

November 11

- 00:00 UTC (7:00 p.m. EST, November 10) at 30.1°N 84.0°W – Tropical Storm Nicole makes landfall at the mouth of the Aucilla River in the Big Bend region of Florida with sustained winds of 40 mph (65 km/h).
- 06:00 UTC (1:00 a.m. EST) at 31.2°N 84.6°W – Tropical Storm Nicole weakens to a tropical depression inland over southwestern Georgia.
- 18:00 UTC (1:00 p.m. EST) at 35.4°N 83.8°W – Tropical Depression Nicole degenerates into a remnant low inland over eastern Tennessee, and is absorbed into a mid-latitude system.

November 30

- The 2022 Atlantic hurricane season officially ends.

== See also ==
- Timeline of the 2022 Pacific hurricane season
- Tropical cyclones in 2022
- Lists of Atlantic hurricanes
