= List of Honduras hurricanes =

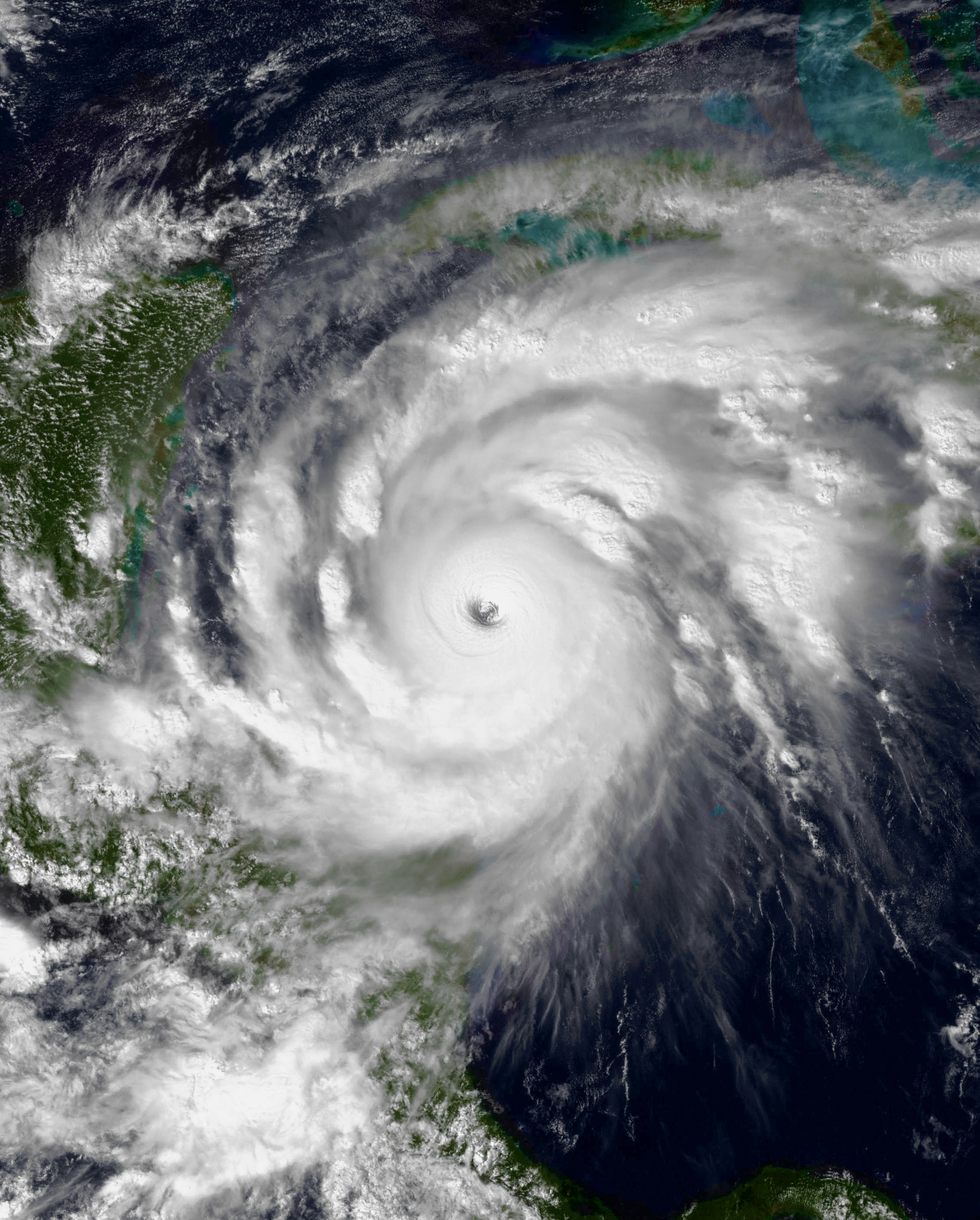
Hurricane Mitch shortly after peak intensity just north of Honduras on 16 October

The Central American country of Honduras regularly experiences hurricanes.

== Pre–1900s ==
- Hurricane Two makes landfall on the Nicaragua–Honduras border, damaging crops.

== 1900s ==
=== 1970s ===
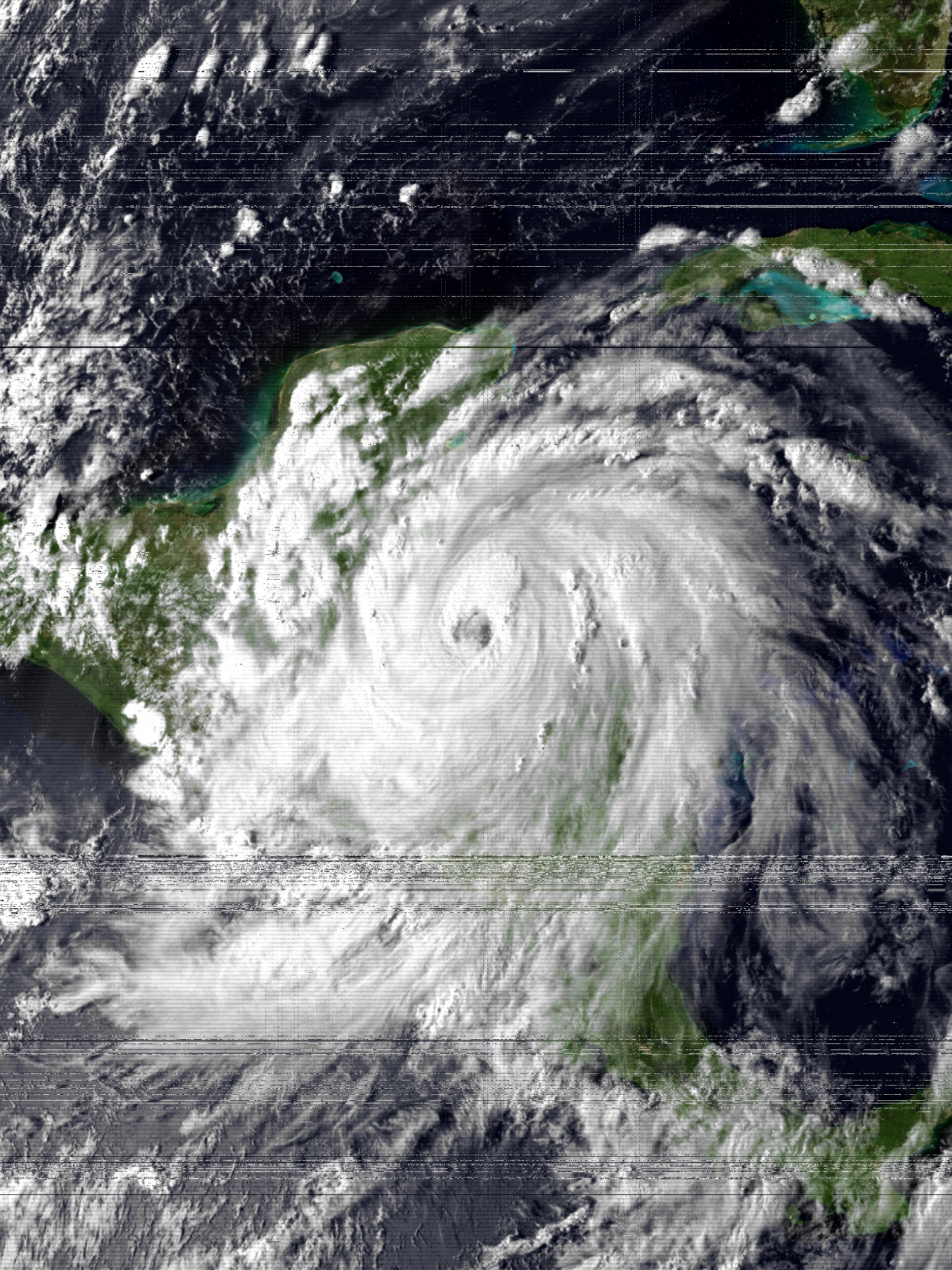
Hurricane Fifi north of Honduras at peak intensity on September 18

- September 18, 1974 — Hurricane Fifi moves north of Honduras, killing around 8,000 people, badly damaging cities and dumping up to 24 inches of rain near the north coast of Honduras.

=== 1990s ===
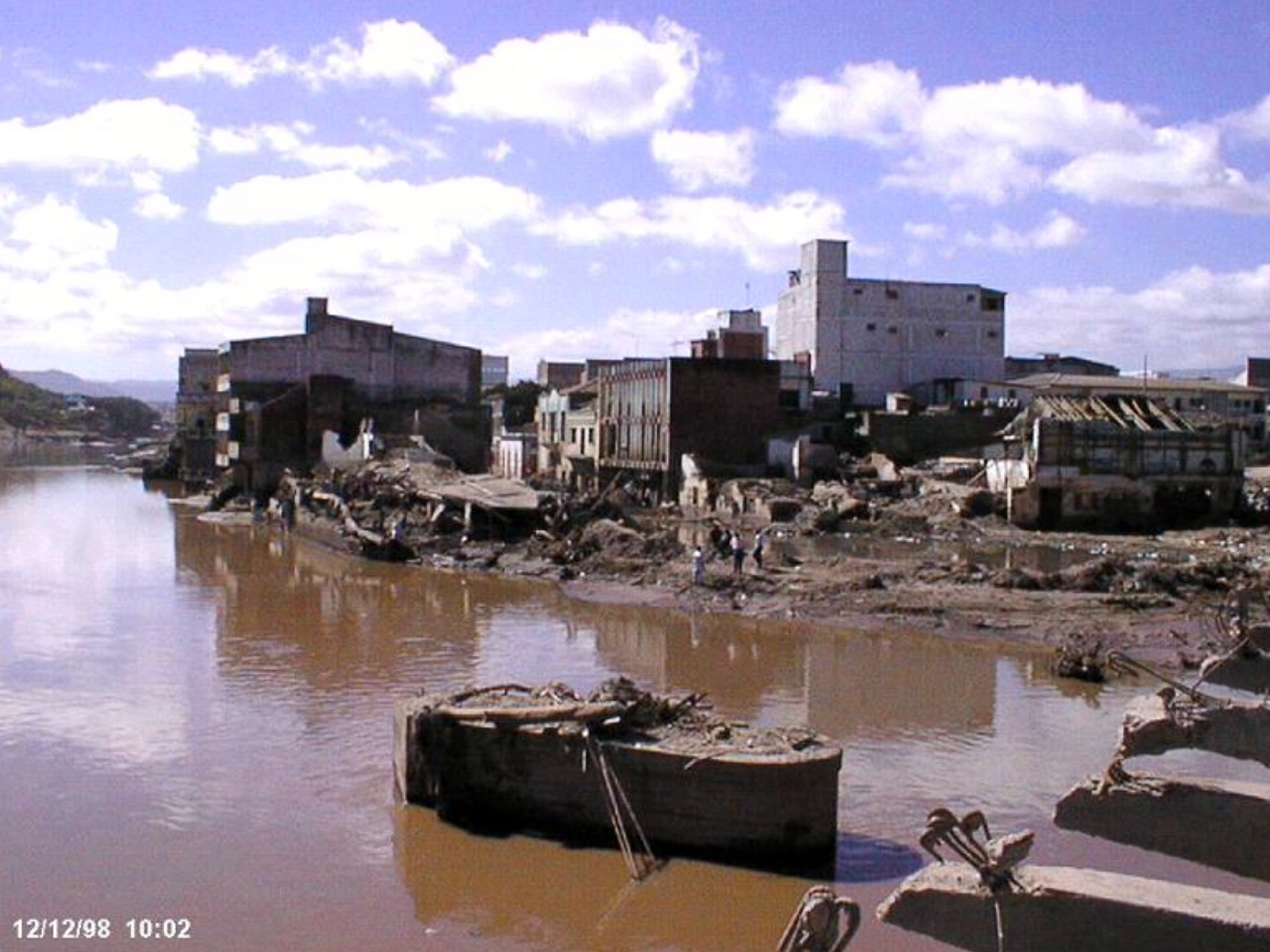
Damage in Tegucigalpa, Honduras following Hurricane Mitch

- August 10, 1993 – Tropical Depression Bret moves south of Honduras, bringing with it rain and wind with its outer bands.
- September 16, 1993 – Tropical Depression Gert passes over Honduras, causing rainfall which worsened the rainfall situation that Tropical Depression Bret caused.
- November 27, 1996 – The remnants of Hurricane Marco drops heavy rainfall over Honduras.
- October 26 – November 1, 1998 – Hurricane Mitch stalls to the northeast of Honduras with 180 mile per hour winds before weakening rapidly and making landfall in Honduras with 80 mile per hour winds. Large amounts of rainfall and high winds lead to major flooding and large amounts of landslides throughout Honduras, leading to the deaths of more than 7,000 people.
- October 30, 1999 – Tropical Depression Katrina passes over Honduras, bringing heavy rainfall.

== 2000s ==
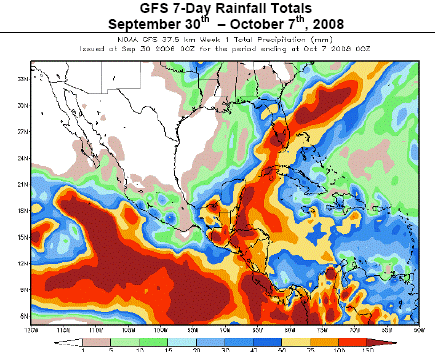
Rainfall forecast for Tropical Depression 16 as by the GFS model. The darker the color, the heavier the rain.

- September 16, 2000 – Tropical Depression Keith moves north of Honduras, dropping enough rain to force more than 200 families to evacuate their homes. One was killed when a wall collapsed and fell on them, and five others were killed when their plane went missing over Roatan Island. A bridge along the Pan-American Highway collapsed, which had been rebuilt only two years before due to Hurricane Mitch. A government agency reported that more than 80,000 people were left isolated in parts of southern Honduras.
- October 31, 2001 – Tropical Depression Michelle drifts over parts of eastern Honduras, dropping very heavy rain. In the Gracias a Dios Department, one of the most impacted areas, over 100 villages were isolated at once. Floods ended up damaging 245 homes across the nation, causing the displacement of 4,393 people. Also, six bridges had been damaged, and out of those six, three were destroyed. The municipality of Yoro was left with no running water or electricity after the storm, and it also destroyed 35 of Honduras water systems. Along with that, 70 percent of the nation's bean crop was destroyed. After the storm passed, 21 people were reported dead, 50 were left missing, and the storm caused $5 million in damage. To make it worst, a cold front passed over the country right after, dropping even more rain.
- October 6, 2005 – The remnants of Hurricane Stan move over Honduras, causing heavy rainfall. More than 2,475 homes were destroyed and seven people were killed.
- October 30, 2005 – The outer bands and remnants of Hurricane Beta drop torrential rainfall over Honduras, peaking at 21.82 inches (554 millimeters). An estimated 60,483 people in Honduras were affected by the storm, mostly due to mudslides and flooding. 1,191 homes, 66 drinking water systems, 30 roads, and 41 bridges were either damaged or destroyed. About 7,692.1 acres (3,112.9 hectares) of farm land was destroyed by flooding and mudslides. An estimate of 11,000 people displaced by the system was reported. The storm caused $170 million lempiras, or around $9 million US dollars in damage.
- November 19, 2005 – Tropical Storm Gamma moves just to the north, dropping locally heavy rain but not producing tropical storm force winds. An unofficial report showed that 4.44 inches (113 millimeters) of rain had fallen on the island of Roatan, and that more than 30 inches (760 millimeters) of rain had been dropped on the northern coast of Honduras before Gamma even reached the country between November 16 and 19. Floods and landslides were triggered by the large amount of rainfall in the northern departments of Honduras, killing 34 and leaving another 13 missing. 50,000 people were stuck after dozens of bridges were washed away, and more than 2,000 homes had been destroyed. Along with that, 5,200 acres (21 kilometers²) of banana crop was destroyed, causing around $13–18 million (2005 USD) in damage.
- September 4, 2007 – Tropical Depression Felix passes over Honduras after making landfall in Nicaragua, dropping heavy rainfall and causing floods. Two people were killed in the capital city of Tegucigalpa after a few streets and markets were flooded. Both the Ulua river and the Chamelecon river overflowed there banks, flooding agricultural land. Overall agriculture damage to Honduras topped out at $H68.28 million ($4.49 million 2020 US dollars).
- May 29, 2008 – Tropical Storm Alma passes over Honduras, still at tropical storm force strength, bringing winds and rain. In Tegucigalpa, TACA Flight 390 was pushed off a wet runway, killing three people and injuring another 80 during the incident. A young girl was also killed when a raging stream swept her away from her family.
- October 15, 2008 – Tropical Depression 16 makes landfall in southeastern Honduras, dropping torrential rainfall after months of drought in Honduras, triggering floods. Around 50% of transportation areas in Honduras were damaged, including 227 roads and 106 bridges, according to Reuters. A landslide near Corquín forced hundreds of residents to evacuate after blocking a river and creating a natural dam. Around 249,840 acres (101,110 hectares) of crops was damaged, with most in the Comayagua Department. Around 2,474 homes were destroyed and another 8,688 had been damaged or flooded by the storm. Overall, the storm killed 60 people and caused $3 billion lempiras (US$225 million).
- November 6, 2008 – Tropical Storm Paloma's outer rainband's drop heavy rainfall over coastal areas, making the already bad situation with the October 2008 Central America floods even worse. Up to eight inches (200 millimeters) of rainfall dropped down over parts of Nicaragua and Honduras. More than 60 people were killed, and 300,000 were left needing assistance.
- November 6, 2009 – Tropical Storm Ida passes over Honduras, dropping heavy rain. A peak of 7.1 inches (180 millimeters) of rainfall was recorded in Puerto Lempira. Some rivers in the country swelled, but none broke their banks. Minor flooding and fallen trees were reported in the northern part of Honduras.

=== 2010s ===
- September 24, 2010 – Tropical Storm Matthew hits Honduras with 50 miles per hour (80 km/h) winds, causing heavy rain and strong winds. Thousands of residents were left without power for hours. On the northern coast, in Olanchito, an overflowed creek flooded a house, but firefighters were able to save the ten people inside. Several homes and roads were damaged along with nine bridges, leaving them inaccessible. Grain, banana, and sugarcane crops were majorly damaged by water from rivers. 15 people were left missing after boarding a sailboat off shore.
- October 11, 2010 – Tropical Storm Paula passes over extreme eastern Honduras, causing strong winds and dumping heavy rainfall. Gale-force winds over land triggered the closure of the Puerto Lempira Airport. Coastal districts recorded 5.9–7.9 inches (150–200 millimeters) of rainfall. Winds from the storm were estimated at 60 miles per hour (97 km/h), and residents from La Mosquitia reported that winds there were stronger than those of Hurricane Mitch. Around four homes and two roads were destroyed by the storm in Puerto Lempira. A dozen structures in Cauquira, which included a police station and school, had been damaged by flooding. Waves more than seven feet (2.1 meters) high also pounded beaches.
- October 23, 2010 – Tropical Storm Richard passes to the north of Honduras, downing trees and power lines. Mudslides cut off an estimated 15,000 people in more than 40 villages. Heavy rain was reported on the off shore Bay Islands. The strongest winds were recorded at 58 miles per hour on Roatán.
- August 19, 2011 – Tropical Storm Harvey moves just north of Honduras, dropping heavy rainfall. The maximum rainfall total was around 7.48 inches (190 millimeters) in Roatán. Despite this, no damage was reported.
- June 17, 2013 – Tropical Depression Barry passes over Honduras, causing significant rainfall and flooding districts of Honduras. The maximum total of rainfall was four inches (100 millimetres) in La Ceiba, resulting in floods that damage 60 homes and affected 300 people. Several landslides occurring in Iroina blocked off roadways. A likely tornado hit Limón, destroying nine homes and damaging another 91. Another four people were injured when their house was lifted up and dropped back down.
- August 3, 2016 – Tropical Storm Earl passes just to the north of Honduras, bringing rough seas. A lobster boat capsized offshore with 83 people on board, leaving two missing. Three homes were damaged in the Cortés department after the outer bands hit, bringing strong winds. Another person was injured in San Pedro Sula.

=== 2020s ===
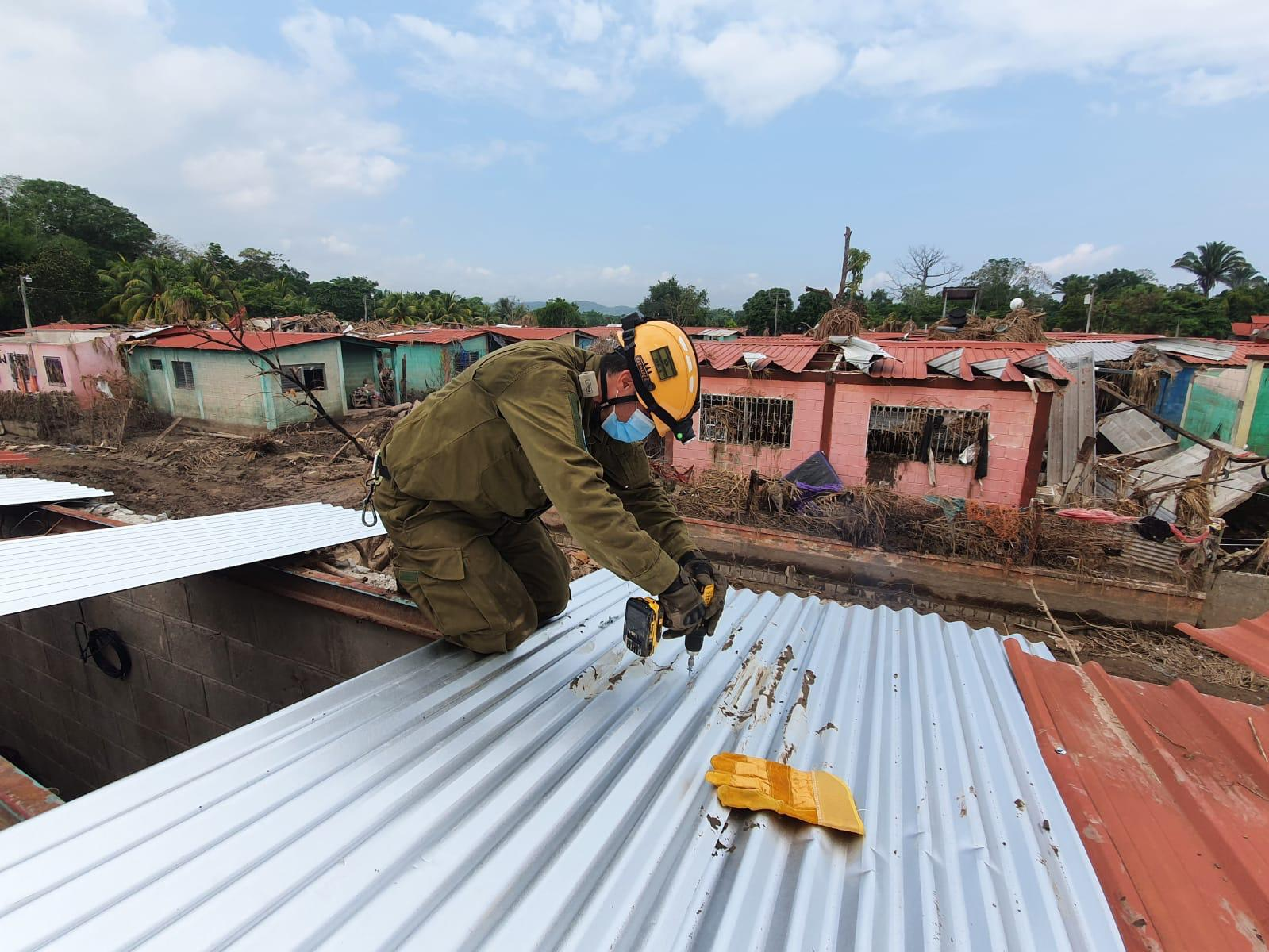
A man works on putting down a metal roof on a damaged house.

- November 6, 2020 – Tropical Depression Eta passes over Honduras, bringing catastrophic amounts of rainfall to Honduras and flooding. At least 457 buildings were damaged, 41 communities were cut off by washed out roads, and nine bridges were destroyed. A ferry that was leaving Roatán was rocked after large waves smashed it while trying to get to the city of La Ceiba, but nobody was injured or killed. A wall collapsed at the El Progreso prison, letting in waist-deep water and forcing the evacuation of 600 inmates. 74 people were killed, mainly due to flooding and landslides. Total enconomic losses are estimated to be about 125 billion lempiras (2020 HD, US$5 billion).
- November 18, 2020 – Tropical Storm Iota passes over western Honduras, stopping recovery efforts for Hurricane Eta, and making damage even worse. A river in Tocoa, Colón overflowed after heavy rainfall. Mudslides and downed trees were reported over much of the country. La Ceiba recorded a wind gust of 58 mph (93 km/h). Many concrete and wooden houses had been decimated. On the morning of November 18, COPECO reported that more than 366,000 people had been affected by the storm. 80% of the roads in Copán Ruinas had been rendered impassible, mostly due to landslides and flooding.
- November 15–16, 2024, Tropical Storm Sara meanders along the northern coast of Honduras, between the Bay Islands and the mainland. Heavy rains caused damage to infrastructure and resulted in seven fatalities.

== Climatology ==
Storms affecting Honduras by month
Month	Number of Storms
May	1
June	1
August	2
September	2
October	6
November	4

Storms affecting Honduras by period
Period	Number of Storms
1990s	5
2000s	6
2010s	6
2020s	3

== Deadly storms ==
Name	Year	Number of Deaths
Fifi	1974	8,000+
Mitch	1998	7,000+

== See also ==
- Hurricanes in Central America

- Hurricanes in Belize
- Hurricanes in Costa Rica
- Hurricanes in Nicaragua

- List of South America hurricanes
