= List of Nicaragua hurricanes =

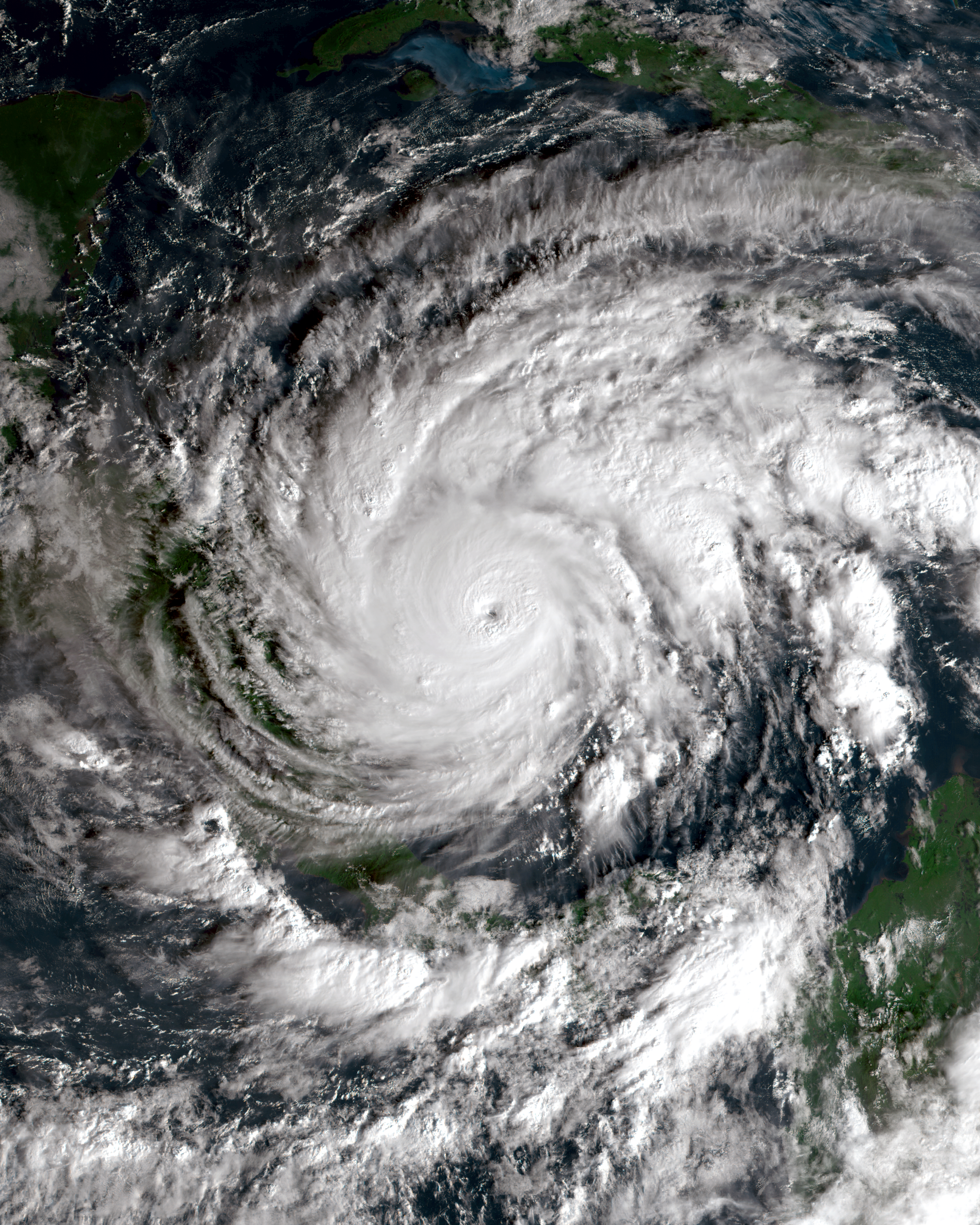
Hurricane Iota at peak intensity on November 16 southeast of Nicaragua

The Central American country of Nicaragua regularly experiences tropical cyclones, with an average of one storm a year. The coast is especially subject to destructive tropical storms and hurricanes, particularly from July through October. The high winds and floods, accompanying these storms often cause considerable destruction of property. Hurricanes or heavy rains in the central highlands where agriculture has destroyed much of the natural vegetation also cause considerable crop damage and soil erosion. One of the deadliest hurricanes to hit Nicaragua has been Hurricane Mitch in 1998, in which the storm killed thousands in the country.

== Pre-1900s ==
- 1876 - Hurricane Four was a hurricane that effected Central America but mainly Nicaragua, it made landfall in Southern Nicaragua as a Category 2 hurricane.
- 1890 - Hurricane Four was a short-lived hurricane and made landfall in Nicaragua just south of Cabo Gracias a Dios as a strong Category 1 hurricane.
- 1893 - Hurricane Two was a short-lived hurricane that effected the Yucatán Peninsula and Central America, the hurricane then made landfall near the Nicaragua–Honduras border as a Category 2 hurricane.

== 1900-1949 ==
- 1906 - 1906 Florida Keys hurricane was a powerful hurricane that mainly impacted Cuba and Florida but made landfall in Nicaragua as a Category 3 hurricane.
- 1908 - Hurricane Nine was a short-lived hurricane that made landfall near the North Caribbean Coast Autonomous Region–South Caribbean Coast Autonomous Region border as a Category 2 hurricane.
- 1911 - Hurricane Four was a hurricane that made landfall in Nicaragua as a Category 2 hurricane and caused over 54 million dollars in damage and 10 fatalities.
- 1940 - Hurricane Eight was a short-lived hurricane that made landfall in Northern Nicaragua as a strong Category 1 hurricane.
- 1941 - The Nicaragua Hurricane of 1941 also known as Hurricane Four was a Category 4 hurricane that made landfall near the Nicaragua—Honduras border.

== 1950-1999 ==
- 1971 - Hurricane Irene–Olivia caused heavy rainfall to the South Caribbean Coast Autonomous Region of Nicaragua and made landfall as a Category 1 hurricane.
- 1988 - Hurricane Joan–Miriam was one of the worst natural disasters to hit Nicaragua on record. Most of the destruction was in Nicaragua. Throughout the country, 148 people perished, 184 were badly hurt, and 100 were unaccounted for. Roughly 23,300 homes were destroyed, with 6,000 being damaged. Many settlements on the Atlantic coast of the country were completely destroyed. In Costa Rica, a total of 55,000 people were evacuated. The national electric company had 620 miles (1,000 km) of downed power lines, at the cost of 2.5 million USD (1988 dollars). A port being constructed with Bulgarian help at El Bluff was severely damaged. On a brighter note, public health measures managed to keep the death toll lower than it could have been. Bluefields was hit with extreme impact. Almost all the 7,500 structures in the city were demolished or had their roofs blown off. The majority of the main buildings in the city were destroyed. The hurricane also wreaked havoc on agriculture in the country. Around 15,700 head of cattle, 20,000 pigs, and 456,000 chickens were killed. The hurricane caused severe disruption in most of Nicaragua's remaining rain forests in the areas it hit, and also stripped trees of leaves. In the southeast rain forests, Joan toppled or snapped 80 percent of the trees and completely destroyed 500,000 hectares (1,200,000 acres) of canopy. Hurricane Joan caused transportation difficulties in the country. Floodwaters destroyed 30 bridges and seriously damaged 36 others. Roads totaling 404 miles (650 km) in length were washed away. The hurricane destroyed much of the infrastructure in Nicaragua, contributing to a recession that was already underway. The losses to cash crops severely reduced exports to under 200 million dollars (1988 USD). These factors combined to aggravate a recession and deepen the economic crisis. Government spending to rebuild infrastructure negated recently introduced anti-inflation measures. Hurricane Joan was a partial cause of Nicaraguans being, on average, worse-off than they were in the 1970s. In all, the storm left at least 250,000 people homeless. Total damages in the country amounted to $751.1 million.
- 1993 - Tropical Storm Bret (1993) made landfall in Nicaragua as a moderate tropical storm, causing flooding that left 25 villages isolated. It also brought heavy rainfall to Nicaragua, destroying 12 bridges and disrupting the drainage systems along the regional road network. Only a month later, Tropical Storm Gert hit the same area.
- 1996 - Hurricane Cesar–Douglas was a long-lasting and strong hurricane and was one of the few to survive the crossover from the Atlantic to east Pacific basin, Cesar made landfall near Bluefields as a weak Category 1 hurricane.
- 1998 - Hurricane Mitch was also one of the worst natural disasters to hit Nicaragua, claiming the lives of around 3,800 people. It also brought extensive rainfall to Nicaragua, bringing over 25 inches of rain to some coastal areas. As a result of the extensive rainfall, the flank of the Casita Volcano failed and became a lahar. This created a mudslide that would cover an area 10 miles (16 km) long and 5 miles (8 km) wide.

== 2000s ==
- 2005 - Hurricane Beta was a major hurricane that impacted central Nicaragua and made landfall as a Category 2 hurricane causing over 6 million dollars in damage along with 6 deaths.
- 2007 - Hurricane Felix was a major hurricane that struck Central America and made landfall just south of the border between Nicaragua and Honduras causing more than 100 deaths and 700 million dollars in damage.
- 2009 - Hurricane Ida made landfall north of Bluefields as a Category 1 hurricane and caused over 9 inches of rain and 2 million dollars in damage.
- 2016 - Hurricane Otto was a late forming hurricane that effected the southeastern corner of Nicaragua and made landfall over the Indio Maíz Biological Reserve which caused heavy rainfall along with 4 fatalities, the name Otto was retired in 2017.
- 2020 - Hurricane Eta caused massive floods across the country as it made landfall as a Category 4 hurricane that caused over 170 million dollars in damage.
- 2020 - Hurricane Iota hit the country of Nicaragua on November 16, just two weeks after Eta made landfall, as a Category 4 hurricane with sustained winds of 145 mph (233 km/h) south of Puerto Cabezas. The Puerto Cabezas airport recorded sustained winds of 83 mph (134 km/h), with gusts of up to 113 mph (182 km/h). Damage reports were somewhat limited, due to Hurricane Eta making landfall just two weeks before also causing high damage. Throughout the Storm, over 160,000 houses lost power and around 47,000 lost water services. Also, 35 communities lost telephone services during the hurricane.
- 2022 – Hurricane Bonnie
- 2022 – Hurricane Julia
- 2024 – Tropical Storm Sara Impacts Nicaragua, Killing 4 In The Process.

== Climatology ==
Storms Affecting Nicaragua by month
Month	Number of Storms
July	3
August	1
September	4
October	9
November	3
Overall	20

Storms affecting Nicaragua by period
Period	Number of storms
1800s	3
1900s	10
2000s	7
Overall	20

== See also ==
- Hurricanes in Central America

- Hurricanes in Belize
- Hurricanes in Costa Rica
- Hurricanes in Honduras
