= List of Belize hurricanes =

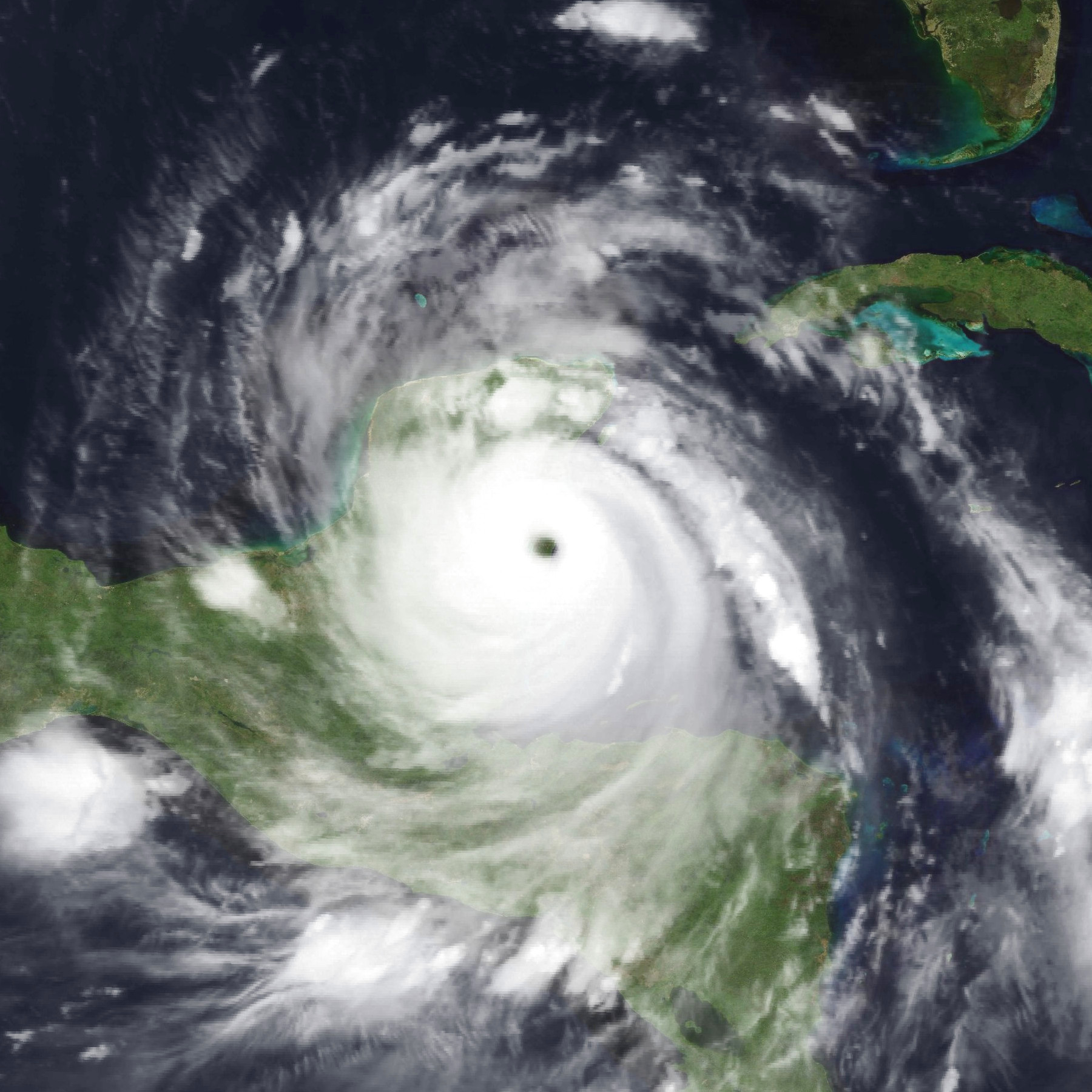
Hurricane Dean nearing landfall 25 miles north of Belize with winds of 175 mph (282 km/h)

The Central American country of Belize regularly experiences the effects of Atlantic hurricanes. Since records began in 1851, only two hurricanes have had Category 5 hurricane strength and have hit or hit close by to Belize, with the two being Hurricane Janet in 1955 and Hurricane Dean in 2007. Along with only two storms of Category 5 strength impacting Belize, only three Category 4 hurricanes have impacted Belize, including the 1931 British Honduras hurricane, Hurricane Keith in 2000, and Hurricane Iris in 2001. The most recent tropical cyclone to hit Belize was Tropical Storm Nadine in 2024.

== Climatology ==
About once a decade, a major hurricane strikes the nation of Belize, located on the eastern Yucatán peninsula.

Storms affecting Belize by month
Month	Number of Storms
May	1
June	2
August	5
September	1
October	4
November	1

Storms affecting Belize by period
Period	Number of Storms
2000s	5
2010s	6
2020s	3

== 1900s ==
- 10 September 1931 - A Category 4 hurricane struck Belize City; it killed 2,500 people, making it the deadliest hurricane in the country's history.
- 31 October 1961 - Hurricane Hattie makes landfall in Belize, causing enough damage to Belize City that the capital city was forced to move inland.

== 2000s ==
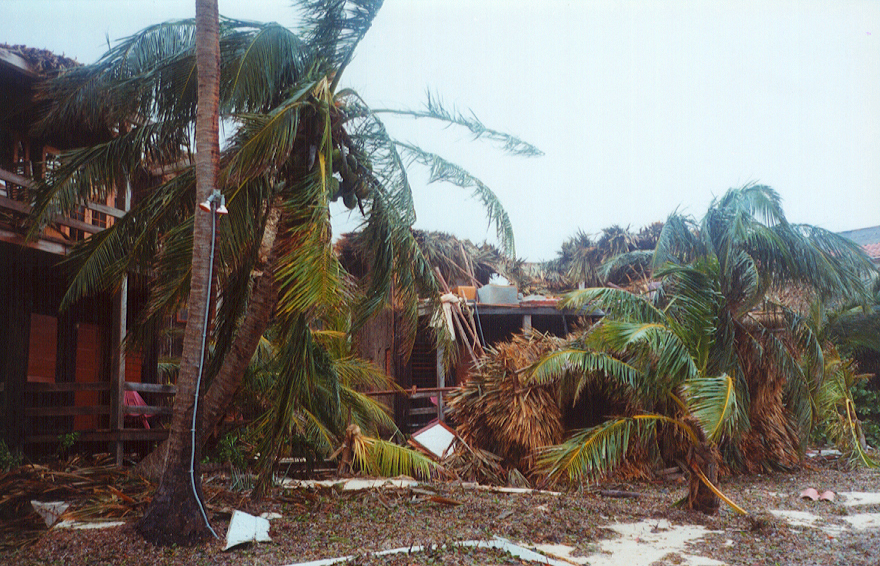
Damage in Belize after Hurricane Keith

- 1 October 2000 - Hurricane Keith stalls off shore of Belize, killing 19 people and causing $280 million in damage. As Keith stalled offshore Belize, water was blown out of Chetumal Bay, with reports of people walking on the dry bay floor, even though the water could return with a slight shift in the wind direction. In Caye Caulker, there were unofficial wind estimates of 125 mph (201 km/h) and the hurricane produced a 4 ft (1.2 m) storm surge. In mainland Belize, wind gusts reached 61 mph (98 km/h) at the Philip S. W. Goldson International Airport. Many areas of Belize lost power and telephone service, which included Belize City. More than 130 houses were destroyed in mainland Belize, and two roofs of hotels had been destroyed. On the islands of San Pedro and Caye Caulker, 90 percent of roofs on homes had been damaged and 676 houses were destroyed, leaving 3,729 people homeless. In Belize City, streets flooded up to 3 ft (0.91 m) of water as a result of around 10 in (250 mm) rainfall, which peaked at 32.67 in (830 mm) at the Belize City International Airport. Rain also raised rivers including the New River, Belize River, and the Hondo River. The Belize River rose to a record level of 21 feet (6.4 meters) in width, isolating 15 villages. Overall, there was $280 million in damage, and 19 people were killed.
- 21 August 2001 - Tropical Storm Chantal makes landfall in northern Belize, producing strong winds and moderate rainfall. Rainfall peaked at 9.81 inches (249 mm), which, combined with winds that peaked at 71 miles per hour in Caye Caulker, damaged crops and agriculture. Large waves also damaged sea walls and piers.
- 9 October 2001 - Hurricane Iris makes landfall in Monkey River Town, Belize as a small but powerful Category 4 hurricane with 145 mile per hour winds, killing 24 people and causing $250 million in damage. Even though Iris made landfall with 145 mile per hour winds, the peak winds that were recorded were 106 miles per hour in Big Creek, Belize. In 35 villages, 95 percent of buildings had been destroyed, although most of the damage was confined to the Toledo and Stann Creek District, with 72 percent of buildings in the Toledo District and 50 percent of the Stann Creek District destroyed, which left around 15,000 people homeless. About 5,000 acres (2,000 hectares) of the banana crop, 3,500 acres (1,400 hectares) of the rice crop, and 3,000 acres (1,200 hectares) of the corn crop had been destroyed. Some tourist related areas had been damaged, including the Maya ruins of Belize, and 20 percent of hotel rooms had been damaged. The Wave Dancer, a 120-foot (37-meter) scuba diving boat capsized after possibly being hit by a tornado in Big Creek, Belize. 28 people, including 20 from the Richmond Dive Club, had been on the boat when it capsized. Iris ripped apart the ropes connecting the boat to the dock, causing it to capsize and quickly flood the boat. Eight people survived, 11 bodies were recovered, and nine other people were presumed dead, including 15 from Richmond and three crew members.
- 21 August 2007 - Hurricane Dean makes landfall on just north of Belize, bringing strong winds, rain, and storm surge. Corozal Town, being near the Mexican-Belize border, was one of the worst affected towns, with powerlines downed and trees uprooted, though damage was less than originally expected. The crop industry in Belize was heavily impacted; almost 30$ million (BZ dollar) of papaya and 3.6$ million (BZ dollar) of sugar was damaged by the storm. As a result of the loss of papaya, almost 1,000 people ended up losing their jobs. The prime minister of Belize at the time, Said Musa, said that it would cost 10$ million (USD) to repair or replace all the damaged homes.
- 31 May 2008 - Tropical Storm Arthur

=== 2010s ===
- 27 June 2010 - Hurricane Alex
- 25 October 2010 - Hurricane Richard
- 20 August 2011 - Tropical Storm Harvey
- 17 June 2013 - Tropical Storm Barry
- 4 August 2016 - Hurricane Earl
- 8 August 2017 - Hurricane Franklin

=== 2020s ===
- 1 September 2020: Hurricane Nana made landfall near Sittee Point, Belize as a minimal hurricane. Due to Nana making landfall in a sparsely populated area within the country, damage was fairly minimal, but still caused $20 million (2020 USD) in damages with no reported fatalities.
- 2 November 2022: Hurricane Lisa caused extensive damage and destructive flooding when it made landfall 11.5 mi (18.5 km) southwest of Belize City near peak intensity with maximum-sustained winds of 90 mph (140 km/h). Lisa caused $100 million (2022 USD) in monetary losses however no fatalities were reported.
- 19 October 2024: Tropical Storm Nadine makes landfall near Belize City at peak intensity, damage was overall minimal with no fatalities reported from the storm.
- 17 November 2024: Tropical Storm Sara, a slow moving system, makes landfall near Dangriga, with sustained winds of 40 mph (65 km/h).

== See also ==
- List of Mexico hurricanes
- Hurricanes in Central America
  - Hurricanes in Honduras
  - Hurricanes in Costa Rica
  - Hurricanes in Nicaragua
