= Costa Rica hurricanes =

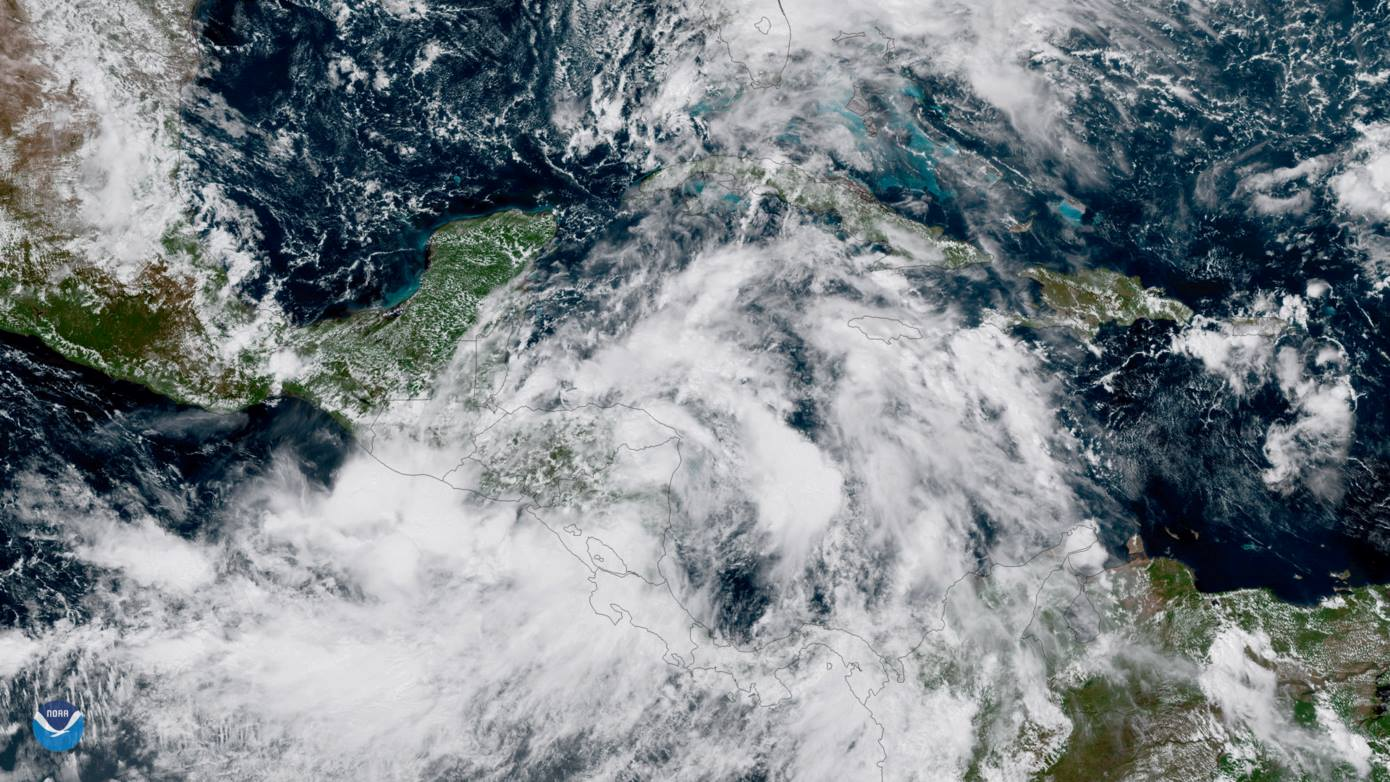
Tropical Storm Nate spreading heavy rain and strong winds over much of Central America, including Costa Rica.

The Central American country of Costa Rica does not regularly experience hurricanes, as only eighteen have been recorded in history. However, most of the hurricanes that hit the country were deadly and destructive, such as Hurricane Nate in 2017. Instituto Meteorológico Nacional (IMN) is the national meteorological agency of Costa Rica. Climatologically, the hurricanes that impact Costa Rica mostly formed in October and November.

== List of storms ==
=== 1887–2000 ===
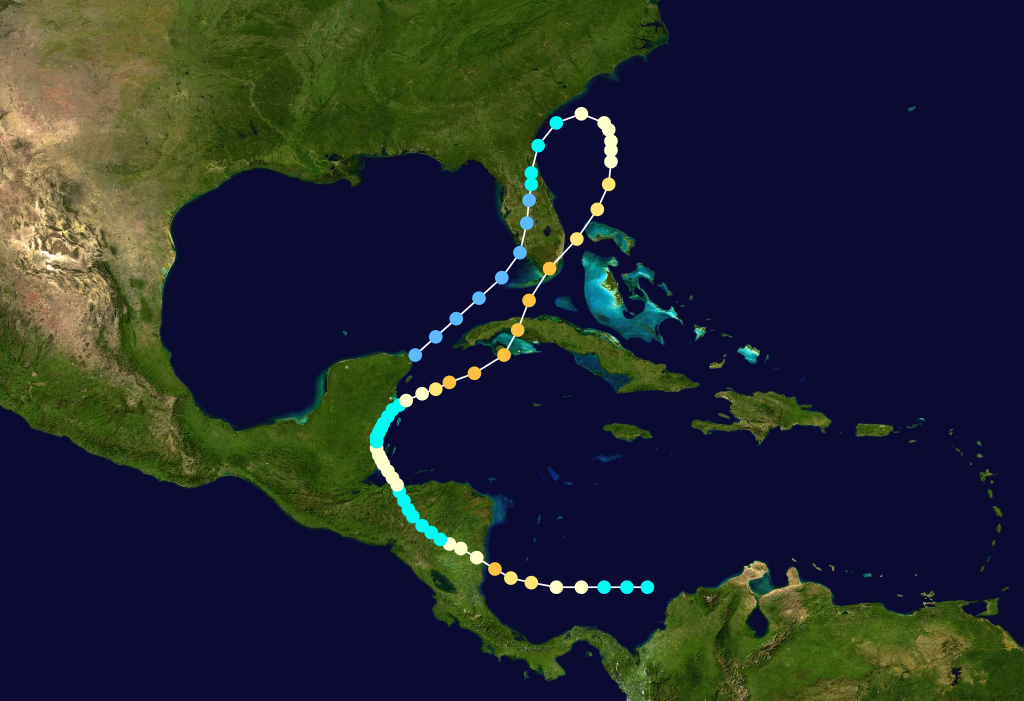
Track of 1906 Florida Keys hurricane, which formed near Costa Rica

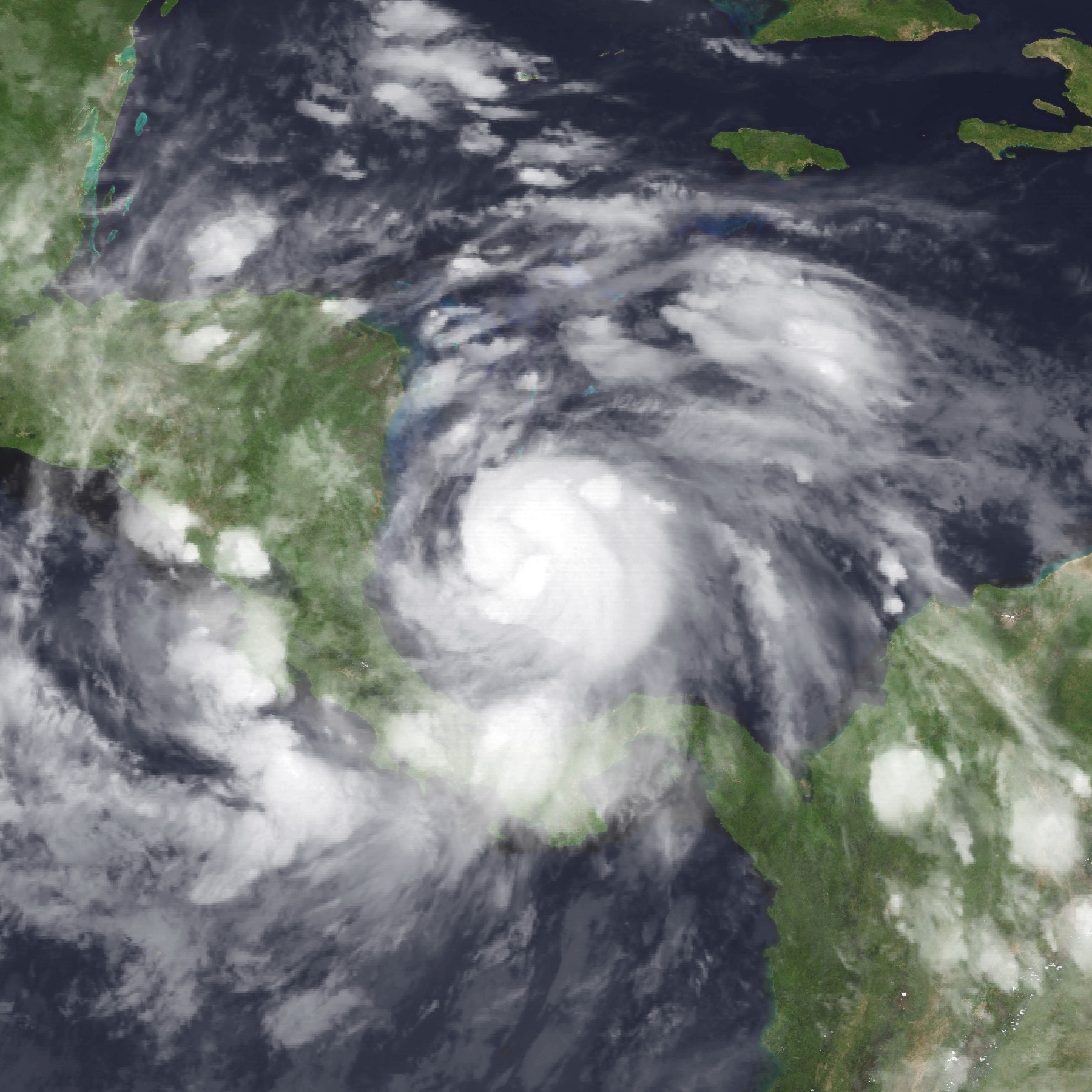
Hurricane Cesar was the deadliest hurricane to hit Costa Rica.

- December 5–12, 1887 – Tropical Storm Nineteen made landfall in Costa Rica.
- October 8–10, 1906 – A hurricane formed near Costa Rica, causing damage to fruit plantations. Total damage was recorded at $1 million (1906 USD), though no deaths were reported.
- November 21–25, 1969 – Persistent rainfall from Hurricane Martha led to street flooding and inundated areas in Costa Rica, namely in Golfito. The effects of Martha resulted in five deaths in the country. The nation incurred flooding from heavy rainfall, which caused significant destruction. The capital city of San José received flooding. In all, damages were estimated near $30 million (1969 USD).
- September 19, 1971 – Hurricane Irene caused $1 million in damage (1971 USD) to the banana crops in Costa Rica.
- November 18, 1973 – Tropical Depression Seventeen made landfall on northern Costa Rica and dissipated later that day. It may have briefly attained tropical storm intensity before making landfall.
- October 22, 1988 – Rainfall from Hurricane Joan caused 20 rivers in Costa Rica to burst their banks, flooding 75 settlements, including the city of Quepos on the Pacific coast. At Ciudad Neily, the Rio Corredores broke through a dike. In total, 7,500 Costa Ricans were rendered homeless. Across the country, at least 28 people were killed and damages amounted to $65 million (1988 USD). Additionally, 75 people were listed as injured, and 18 people were listed as missing.
- August 10, 1993 – Tropical Storm Bret brought heavy rainfall and high seas to the east coast of Costa Rica, as well as gusty winds. One death occurred in the country, as well as US$7.7 million (1993 USD) in damage.
- September 15, 1993 – Hurricane Gert caused heavy damage in much of the nation. Although Gert's center remained off the coast of Costa Rica, its large circulation produced brisk winds and heavy rainfall across the country. A local weather station recorded 13.1 inches (332 mm) of rain during the storm. The initial rainfall raised the levels of many rivers, exacerbating the flood threat. The imminent overflow of the Tempisque River prompted wide-scale evacuations, though the river crested gradually without major consequences. After hours of prolonged rainfall, many Pacific regions such as Quepos, Pérez Zeledón, and Osa experienced flooding and landslides, which inflicted moderate damage to roads and bridges. The floods ruined about 500 acres (2.0 km^{2}) of banana crop and damaged oil palm plantations. Small-scale farmers of reed, maize, beans, and rice were also affected. The storm disrupted local fishing and wrecked several small boats in Quepos. High winds brought great destruction to about 65 percent of the vegetation in the Manuel Antonio National Park, vastly impacting the tourism-driven economy of Quepos. Gert left moderate property damage in its wake; it destroyed 27 homes and otherwise damaged 659, mostly because of flooding. Overall costs totaled $3.1 million (1993 USD), of which $1.7 million (1993 USD) was due to the impaired infrastructure. Roughly 1,000 people sought shelter during the storm. Owing to the timely preparations in the country, only one fatality was attributable to Gert when a landslide buried a home.
- July 28, 1996 – Hurricane Cesar hit Costa Rica, causing deadly and destructive landslides and widespread flash flooding. River flooding damaged 51 houses and washed away 213 more; 72 bridges were also destroyed. The road network was significantly damaged. Costa Rica requested international aid subsequent to the storm. Across the country, at least 39 people were killed and damage amounted to $151 million (1996 USD). Additionally, 29 people were listed as missing.
- October 26–28, 1998 – Hurricane Mitch dropped heavy rains in Costa Rica, causing flash flooding and mudslides across the country, mostly in the northeastern part of the country. The storm impacted 2,135 homes to some degree, of which 241 were destroyed, leaving 4,000 homeless. Throughout the country, the rainfall and mudslides affected 126 bridges and 800 miles (1,300 km) or roads, mostly on the Inter-American Highway which was affected by Hurricane Cesar, two years prior. Mitch affected 115 sq. miles (300 km^{2}) of crop lands, causing damage to both export and domestic crops. In all, Hurricane Mitch caused $92 million in damage (1998 USD) and seven deaths.

=== 2000–2009 ===
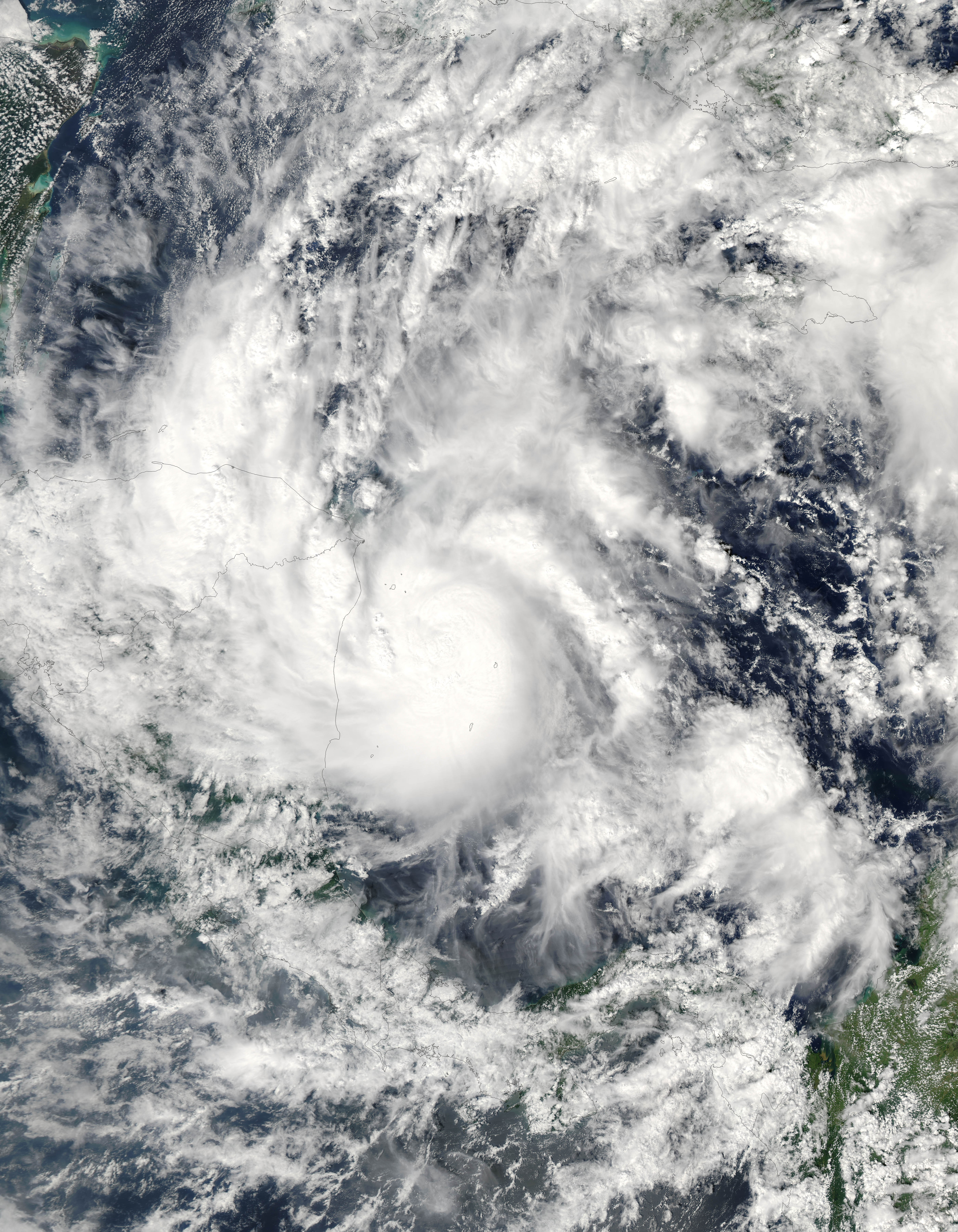
Hurricane Beta intensifying northeast of Costa Rica on October 29

- October 25–31, 2005 – Hurricane Beta caused minimal damage and no deaths in Costa Rica. Although Panama and Costa Rica were not in the direct path of Hurricane Beta, storm warnings were issued for the two countries on October 27 as heavy rains, up to 20 in (508 mm), from the outer bands of Beta were possible.
- May 29–31, 2008 – Tropical Storm Alma, a strong Pacific tropical storm, brought heavy rain to parts of Costa Rica. The National Emergency Commission of Costa Rica activated emergency shelters prior to the arrival of the storm; 250 people in Parrita evacuated from their homes. As the storm hit, the precipitation caused river flooding, threatening 17 communities. It also caused widespread mudslides, which closed at least eight roads. The storm downed trees and power lines, leaving about 42,000 people without electricity in the country. Two deaths were reported in the country, and damage in Costa Rica was estimated at $35 million (2008 USD). (Note: Caused ₡20 billion in Costa Rican colónes.)
- November 4–5, 2009 – Hurricane Ida caused mudslides and flash flooding in Costa Rica. Upon the formation of Ida, officials in Costa Rica placed most northern regions under a yellow alert. Personnel from the Costa Rican Red Cross were also placed on standby. The outer bands of Ida brought torrential rainfall, triggering isolated landslides. One of these landslides damaged three homes, leading to officials evacuating five families. Homes near Los Diques de Cartago were flooded and the sewage system was damaged, resulting in overflow.

=== 2010–2019 ===
Infrared satellite loop of Hurricane Otto making landfall as a Category 3 hurricane near the Nicaragua-Costa Rican border on November 24

- October 12, 2011 – Tropical Depression Twelve-E caused landslides and flooding damaged property and roads.
- October 19, 2015 – Flooding from the precursor disturbance of Hurricane Patricia in Central America damaged 10 homes in Jacó.
- November 24, 2016 – Hurricane Otto was the first hurricane to pass directly over Costa Rica since records began in 1851. In Costa Rica, some areas near the border with Nicaragua observed over a month's worth of rainfall; three-day accumulations exceeded 8 in (200 mm) in many areas. The highest recorded total was 12.11 in (308 mm) at the Miravalles Volcano. The National Meteorological Institute of Costa Rica reported that Otto killed at least ten people in the country, mostly from flash flooding and landslides, including six in Upala, three in Bagaces, and one in Guayabo. Costa Rican president Luis Guillermo Solis described the situation as "chaotic and unprecedented", with the worst effects in Upala canton. Authorities calculated at least $192.2 million (2016 USD) (Note: ₡106 billion in Costa Rican colónes.) in damages across the country, including $68.9 million (2016 USD) (Note: ₡38 billion in Costa Rican colónes.) in Upala canton, and another $34.4 million (2016 USD) (Note: ₡19 billion in Costa Rican colónes.) in Bagaces. The hurricane damaged 14 water systems. The president declared three days of national mourning in the wake of the hurricane. Officials opened 38 shelters that housed 3,370 people, mostly in Upala.

Infrared satellite imagery showing Nate bringing heavy rain en masse to Nicaragua and Costa Rica

- October 4–6, 2017 – Hurricane Nate was one of the worst hurricanes to ever hit Costa Rica. At the risk of flooding rains, Costa Rica's Central Valley, Pacific coast, and Huetar Norte region were placed under red alert for at least 3 days, starting on October 4, while a yellow alert was issued for the Caribbean coast. The greatest quantities, reaching 19.19 inches (487 mm), fell in Maritima; many other central Pacific locales, such as Quepos, recorded over 4.7 inches (120 mm) that day. In contrast, the capital of San José received no more than 1.4 inches (36 mm). In the canton of Oreamuno, Cartago Province, a bridge and part of a riverside house succumbed to the forces of a river, swollen from the initial rains on October 3. By October 5, the situation culminated: muddy waters surged through streets, neighborhoods, and even homes—some submerged to their roofs—as an increasing number of rivers burst their banks. About 800 residents living in risk zones had to be rescued, including 200 in Palmar Norte when the overflowing Térraba River swept away houses and belongings. The storm cut off drinking water to nearly 500,000 people, and left 18,500 without power. Torrents, landslides, and fallen trees—particularly in the provinces of Cartago, Puntarenas, Guanacaste, Alajuela, and San José—claimed the lives of 14 people, and forced 11,300 into 170 shelters across Costa Rica. The flooding was the worst to hit the country in recent years, leading to the "biggest crisis in Costa Rican history" according to President Luis Guillermo Solís. In response, Solís declared a state of emergency for the entire country on October 6, as well as a national day of mourning. The country's infrastructure, especially the road networks in southern regions, sustained tremendous damage from expansive flooding, landslides and subsidence; 117 roads throughout all provinces but Limón were affected in some way or form, 40 of which were rendered impassable. Spanning 413 mi (665 km) through Costa Rica, the Inter-American Highway suffered various degrees of damage at 112 different sites, ranging from superficial cracks and potholes, to total structural failures. At least 42 bridges collapsed, many waterways and drainage systems were overwhelmed, and a number of routes were practically "wiped out", isolating villages and leading to widespread disruptions in the transport sector. Many petrospheres at the World Heritage archaeological site of Palmar Sur were covered with up to 12 inches (30 cm) of mud. The infrastructural costs across the country exceeded $17.5 million (2017 USD) (Note: Exceeding ₡10 billion in Costa Rican colónes.), with repairs expected to take years. With over 306,000 acres (124,000 hectares) of arable land damaged, the agricultural sector reported significant losses. Among the hardest hit crops were sugarcane, vegetables, grains, melons and papayas, especially in the Guanacaste, Puntarenas and Central Valley regions. In Guanacaste, the storm converted pastures and sugarcane fields into ponds and washed out 3,200 acres (1,300 hectares) of rice. Total damages caused by the hurricane in Costa Rica are estimated at $562 million (2017 USD) (Note: ₡322.1 billion in Costa Rican colónes.) making it the costliest natural disaster in Costa Rican history.

=== 2020–present ===
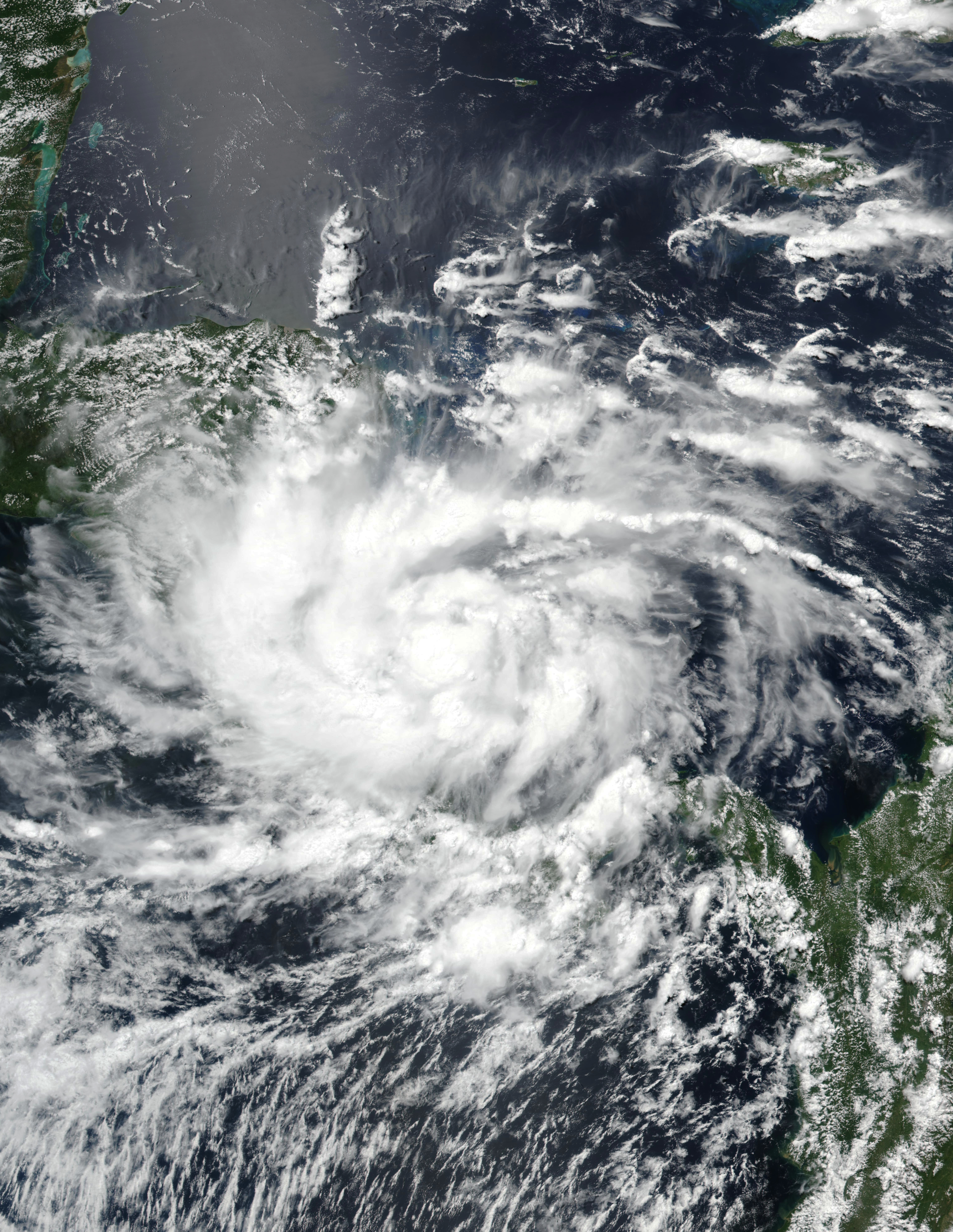
Tropical Storm Bonnie on July 1, 2022

- August 20–22, 2020 – Tropical Depression Fourteen, which would later become Hurricane Marco, caused heavy rainfall in Costa Rica. According to the Instituto Meteorológico Nacional of Costa Rica, heavy rainfall from Marco affected parts of the country for three days. In Santa Cruz, Guanacaste Province, accumulations reached 17.0 in (431 mm); this was more than twice the average August rainfall of 9.1 in (231 mm). Areas in and around Santa Cruz reported flooding.
- November 3–5, 2020 – The outer bands of Hurricane Eta brought significant rainfall to Costa Rica. A mudslide killed 2 people as flooding was reported in parts of the country.
- June 30–July 1, 2022 – Tropical Storm Bonnie makes landfall in Costa Rica, just south of the Nicaragua-Costa Rica border.

== Climatology ==
Storms Affecting Costa Rica by month
Month	Number of Storms
May	1
July	1
August	2
September	2
October	7
November	5
December	1
Overall	18

Storms affecting Costa Rica by period
Period	Number of storms
1800s	1
1900s	9
2000s	3
2010s	4
2020s	2
Overall	19

== Deadly storms ==
The following are a list of Atlantic hurricanes that caused fatalities in Costa Rica.

Name	Year	Number of deaths
Cesar	1996	39 (29 missing)
Joan	1988	28
Nate	2017	14
Otto	2016	10
Mitch	1998	7
Martha	1969	5
Alma	2008	2
Eta	2020	2
Gert	1993	1

== See also ==
- Hurricanes in Central America
  - Hurricanes in Nicaragua
- List of South America hurricanes
