= Tropical Storm Sara =

Atlantic tropical storm

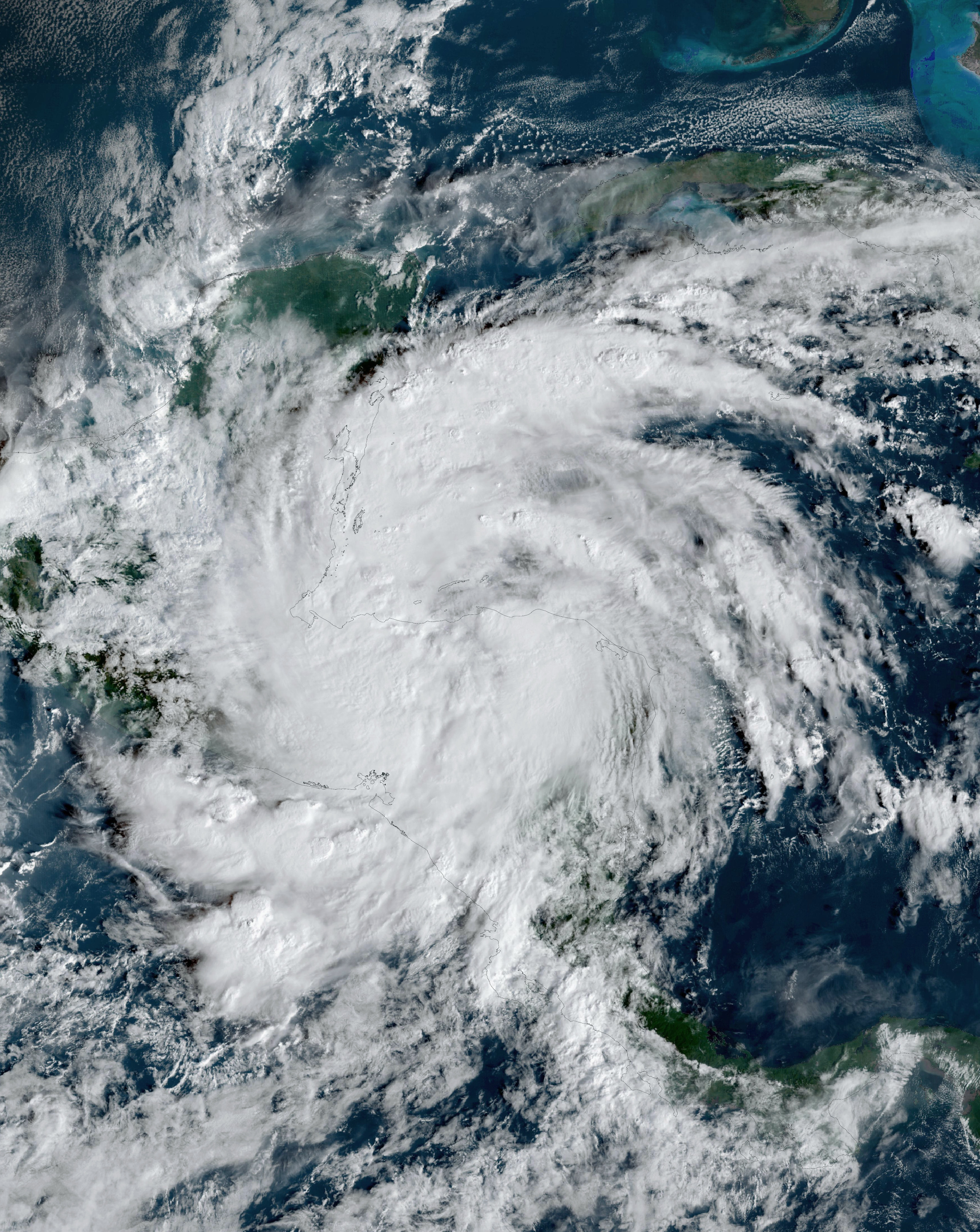
- Tropical Storm Sara off the coast of Honduras on November 15

Meteorological history
- Formed: 14 November 2024
- Dissipated: 18 November 2024

Tropical storm
- 1-minute sustained (SSHWS/NWS)
- Highest winds: 50 mph (85 km/h)
- Lowest pressure: 997 mbar (hPa); 29.44 inHg

Overall effects
- Fatalities: 12
- Missing: 2
- Damage: $139 million (2024 USD)
- Areas affected: Dominican Republic; Haiti; Nicaragua; Honduras; Guatemala; Belize; Mexico (Yucatán Peninsula)
- Part of the 2024 Atlantic hurricane season

Tropical Storm Sara was a slow-moving tropical cyclone that caused severe flooding in northern Central America in November 2024. The eighteenth and final named storm of the extremely active 2024 Atlantic hurricane season, Sara developed from a disturbance over the central Caribbean Sea associated with a tropical wave. It consolidated into a tropical depression early on November 14, and strengthened into Tropical Storm Sara later that same day. The next day, the storm made landfall in Punta Patuca, Honduras and slowly moved parallel through the northern coast. Later, on the morning of November 17, Sara made a second landfall near Dangriga, Belize. Inland, the storm weakened into a tropical depression, then degenerated into a remnant low while over Mexico's Yucatán Peninsula. Overall, Sara killed 12 people, caused two people to go missing, and inflicted approximately US$139 million in damage.

== Meteorological history ==
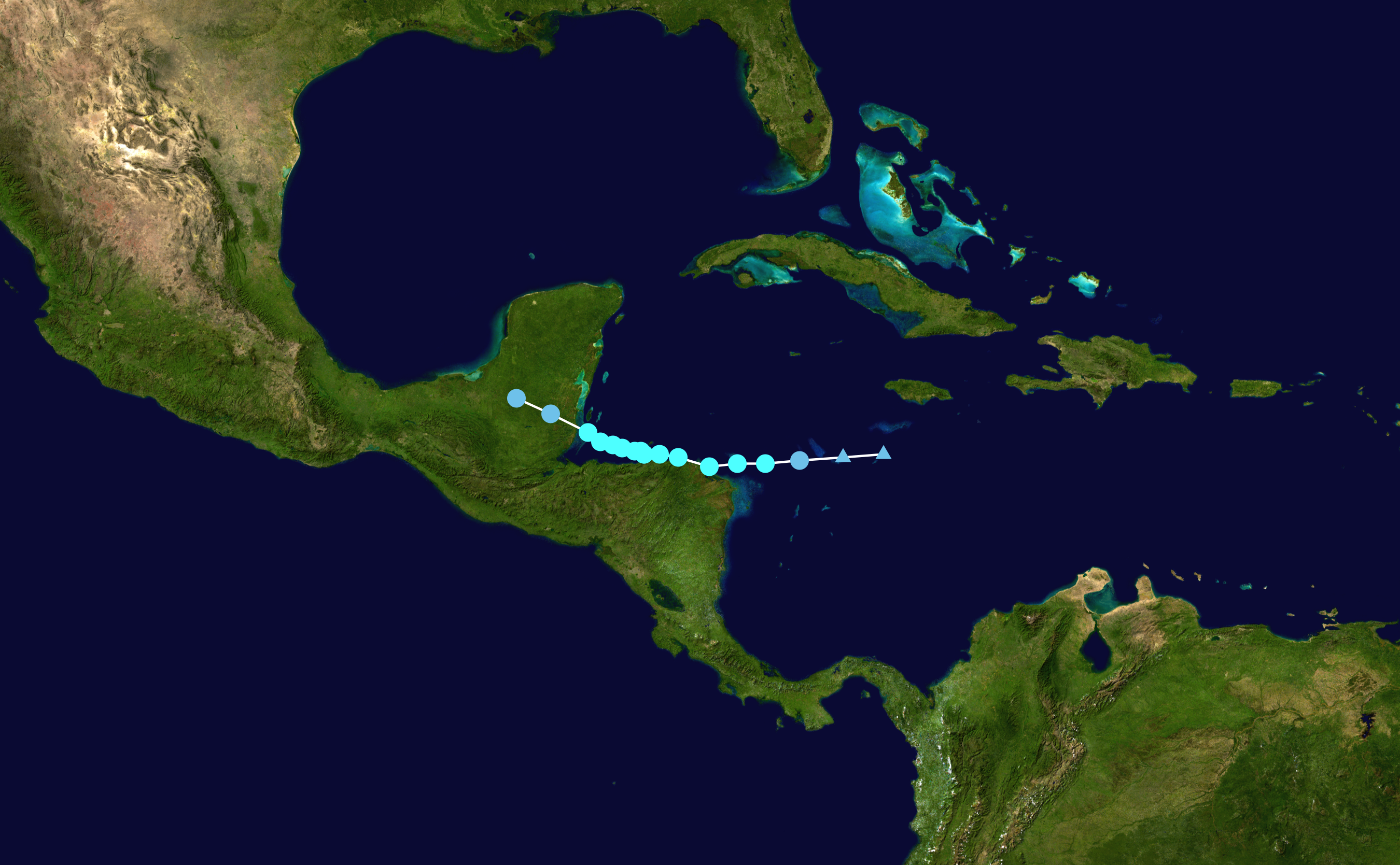
Map plotting the storm's track and intensity, according to the Saffir–Simpson scale Map key Saffir–Simpson scale Tropical depression (≤38 mph, ≤62 km/h) Tropical storm (39–73 mph, 63–118 km/h) Category 1 (74–95 mph, 119–153 km/h) Category 2 (96–110 mph, 154–177 km/h) Category 3 (111–129 mph, 178–208 km/h) Category 4 (130–156 mph, 209–251 km/h) Category 5 (≥157 mph, ≥252 km/h) Unknown Storm type Tropical cyclone Subtropical cyclone Extratropical cyclone, remnant low, tropical disturbance, or monsoon depression

On November 11, an area of low-pressure merged with a tropical wave over the southwest Caribbean Sea. The system moved generally westward toward Central America into the next day, and the National Hurricane Center (NHC) noted the high possibility of further organization due to favorable environmental conditions. Due to the system becoming expected to produce tropical storm or hurricane conditions, the NHC, with the Honduran and Nicaraguan governments, designated the system as a potential tropical cyclone and issued the respective watches and warnings on November 13. The system progressed westward, increasing in organization. By 06:00 UTC November 14, the system had a well-defined core, becoming designated as Tropical Depression Nineteen. Data from Hurricane Hunters indicated that the system had become a tropical storm, Sara, by 12:00 UTC November 14. Being steered by a large ridge in the Southeastern United States, Sara continued moving westward. It also continued to intensify over the warm Caribbean Sea. Sara made its first landfall near Punta Patuca, Honduras, at 01:20 UTC on November 15 with 45 miles per hour (72 km/h) winds.

Sara would then pull off of Honduras, reforming its core in the process. It would reach a peak strength of 50 miles per hour (80 km/h) at 12:00 UTC on November 15. Sara began moving westward before falling stationary over the Bay Islands on November 16. Later that day, it moved away from the Bay Islands into the Gulf of Honduras. Despite having stayed offshore, Sara remained a weak tropical storm with winds of 45 mph (75 km/h) due to the interaction between its broader circulation and the mountainous terrain of northern Honduras, and was struggling to produce deep convection and began degrading. Sara made landfall in Belize at around 14:00 UTC on November 17, near Dangriga, with sustained winds of 40 mph (65 km/h). Just before landfall, the storm underwent a burst of convection near the center, with bursting deep convection and lightning flashes. Subsequent land interaction caused Sara to weaken. Its low level circulation dissipated on the Guatemala–Mexico border on November 18. Upper-level remnants of Sara moved into the Bay of Campeche where it would then merge with a frontal system over the Southeast United States.

== Preparations ==
On November 13, the governments of Honduras and Nicaragua issued hurricane watches and tropical storm warnings for the northeastern coast of Honduras from Punta Castilla to the Honduras–Nicaragua border and the northeastern coast of Nicaragua from the Honduras–Nicaragua border to Puerto Cabezas, respectively. Guatemala's Caribbean and Belize's entire coast was placed under a tropical storm warning on November 15. Additionally, the government of Mexico issued a tropical storm warning for the Quintana Roo coast from Puerto Costa Maya southward to Chetumal. The Eastern Slopes of the Maya Mountains were placed under landslide warning.

President of Honduras Xiomara Castro declared a state of emergency for the nation. Six departments in Honduras were placed under red warning and four under yellow. Golosón and Juan Manuel Gálvez International Airports in Honduras were closed. American and United Airlines waived some fees related to flight rescheduling. Over 8,000 Hondurans moved to shelters and 15,000 evacuated as a result of Sara.

The government of Belize's National Emergency Management Organization activated its district committees. The Ministry of Education, Culture, Science, and Technology canceled classes for November 18. Philip S. W. Goldson International Airport was closed. From Middle Caye, 650 people left for the mainland. Public transportation in San Pedro Town was suspended.

In Mexico, the government rushed to repair buildings that lost their roofs due to strong winds earlier in the week.

== Impact ==
Deaths by country
Country	Deaths
Dominican Republic	2
Haiti	1
Nicaragua	2
Honduras	7
Total	12

=== Hispanola ===
The nascent disturbance caused flooding in the Dominican Republic, resulting in the evacuation of 1,767 people, isolating 54 communities, destroying two homes and damaging 487 more. Two fishermen were left missing and were later found dead near Sabana de la Mar. Floods also affected southern Haiti, killing one person, leaving two missing and damaging 3,554 houses in Sud Department.

=== Central America ===
Two people were killed in Nicaragua; one in San Francisco de Cuapa and another in Estelí. Over 1,800 houses and six schools were flooded, of which three were destroyed, affecting 5,000 people.

Over 251 communities were isolated in Honduras. Some areas in the nation saw 19.7 in (500 mm) of rain. Nine bridges were destroyed due to Sara, and many more were damaged. Saopin bridge in La Ceiba collapsed due to flooding in the Cangrejal River. A pedestrian bridge on the Bermejo River collapsed in San Pedro Sula. In total, eleven bridges were destroyed and 31 damaged as a result of Sara. The Ulúa and Chamelecón Rivers swelled up, approaching populated areas. Three people were rescued in Gracias a Dios Department. A man drowned in the department of Yoro. A traffic accident occurred in Santa Cruz de Yojoa, killing another person. Across the country, 427 houses were destroyed and 4,440 others were damaged. Over 2,000 rescues were made in the nation. In total, six people were killed as a result of drowning, and one person were declared missing. Damage in agriculture and infrastructure amounted to 3.49 billion lempiras (US$139 million).

In Belize, Ambergris Caye saw flooding and beach erosion due to Sara. Downtown San Ignacio was inundated. Communities along the Mopan and Macal Rivers were acutely affected by Sara. Dams began to overflow as well. Celebrations related to Garifuna Settlement Day were disrupted by Sara.

Over 1,000 homes were flooded in Guatemala as a result of 25 rivers overflowing. Access to potable water was disrupted across the country as well. Flooding also caused agricultural damage in El Salvador.

=== Mexico ===
In Chetumal, Sara caused major flooding and damage. Strong winds tore roofs off of houses, some of which had been reinstalled by trucks prior to the storm's arrival. Garbage along the streets of Chetumal was piled up due to flooding as the sewers overflowed.

== See also ==
- Weather of 2024
- Tropical cyclones in 2024
- Timeline of the 2024 Atlantic hurricane season
- List of Belize hurricanes
- List of Honduras hurricanes
- Tropical Storm Nadine (2024) – another tropical storm which made landfall in Belize earlier in the year
