= Hurricane Bonnie (2022) =

Category 3 Atlantic and Pacific hurricane

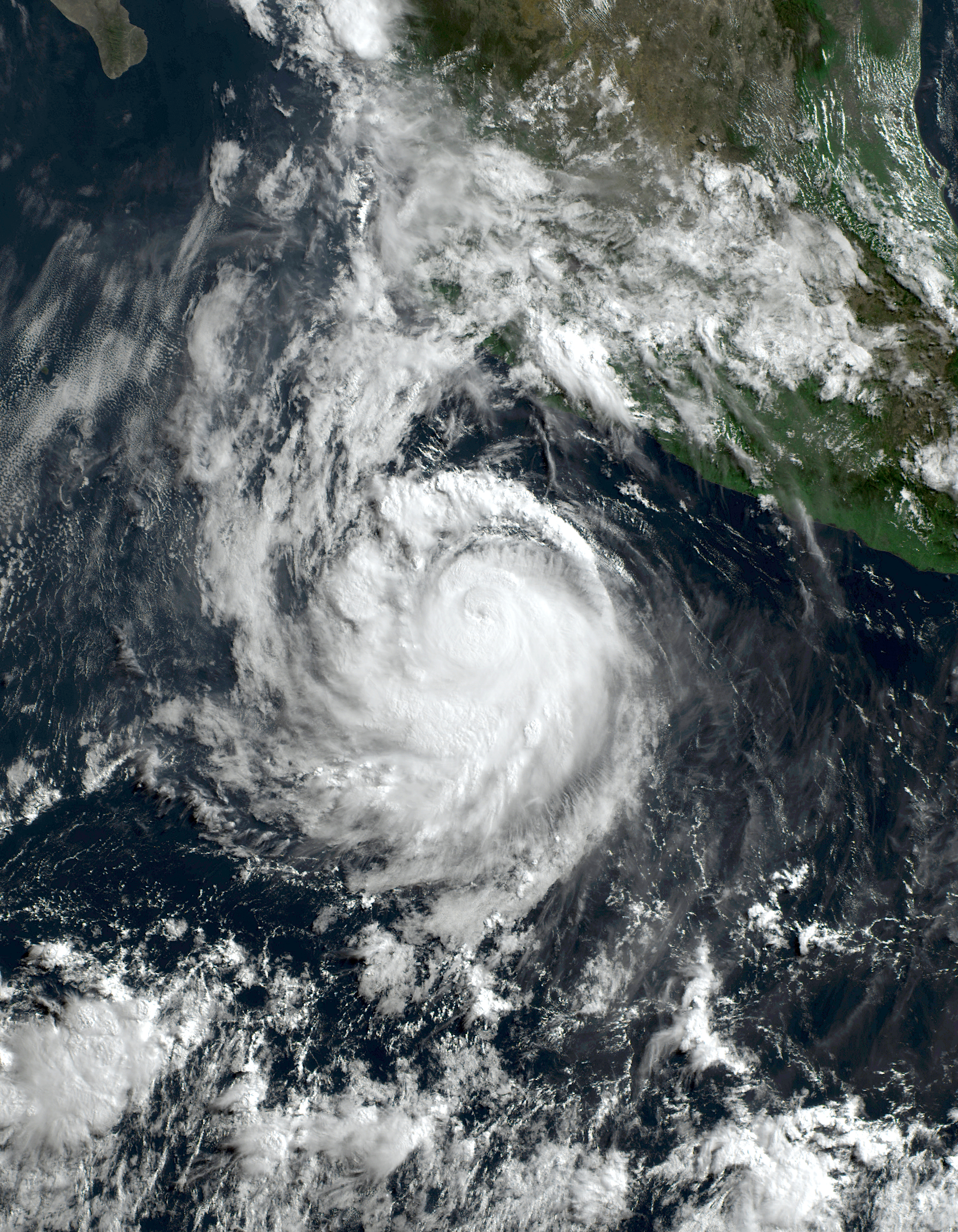
- Bonnie at peak intensity south of Mexico on July 5

Meteorological history
- Formed: July 1, 2022
- Post-tropical: July 9, 2022
- Dissipated: July 11, 2022

Category 3 major hurricane
- 1-minute sustained (SSHWS/NWS)
- Highest winds: 115 mph (185 km/h)
- Lowest pressure: 964 mbar (hPa); 28.47 inHg

Overall effects
- Fatalities: 5
- Damage: $25 million (2022 USD)
- Areas affected: Trinidad and Tobago, Grenada, Venezuela, ABC Islands, Colombia, San Andres Island, Central America, Southwestern Mexico, Revillagigedo Islands
- IBTrACS /
- Part of the 2022 Atlantic and Pacific hurricane seasons

Hurricane Bonnie was a strong tropical cyclone that survived a crossover from the Atlantic Ocean to the Pacific Ocean, the first to do so since Hurricane Otto in 2016. The second named storm of the 2022 Atlantic hurricane season, it originated from a strong tropical wave that moved off the west coast of Africa on June 23. Moving with little development despite favorable conditions, the National Hurricane Center (NHC) started advisories on it as Potential Tropical Cyclone Two late on June 27, due to its imminent threat to land. The disturbance finally organized into Tropical Storm Bonnie at 13:15 UTC on July 1, and made brief landfalls on the Costa Rica–Nicaragua border with winds of 50 miles per hour (80 km/h). It later became the fourth named storm, third hurricane, and first major hurricane of the 2022 Pacific hurricane season after crossing Nicaragua and Costa Rica from east to west on July 2 and intensifying to a Category 3 hurricane on July 5. Bonnie rapidly weakened, dissipating over the North Pacific.

Bonnie was the first of two tropical cyclones in 2022 to cross from the Atlantic to the Pacific, the second being Hurricane Julia. At least 3,572 individuals were evacuated in Costa Rica. Heavy rains led to flooding and numerous mudslides, with 40 homes flooded in Trinidad and Tobago. A total of 5 people were killed, and damage was estimated at $25 million.

== Meteorological history ==
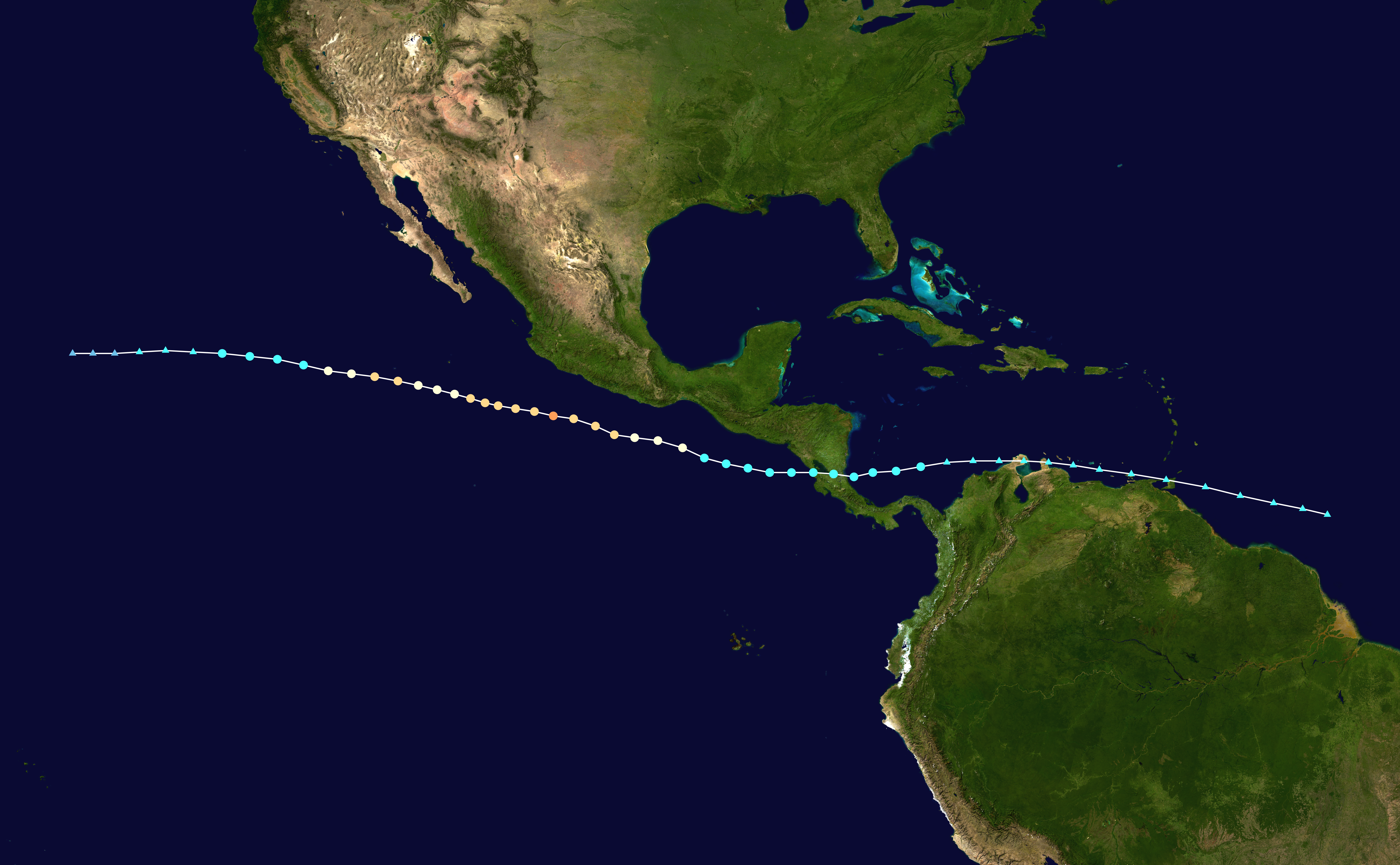
Map plotting the storm's track and intensity, according to the Saffir–Simpson scale Map key Saffir–Simpson scale Tropical depression (≤38 mph, ≤62 km/h) Tropical storm (39–73 mph, 63–118 km/h) Category 1 (74–95 mph, 119–153 km/h) Category 2 (96–110 mph, 154–177 km/h) Category 3 (111–129 mph, 178–208 km/h) Category 4 (130–156 mph, 209–251 km/h) Category 5 (≥157 mph, ≥252 km/h) Unknown Storm type Tropical cyclone Subtropical cyclone Extratropical cyclone, remnant low, tropical disturbance, or monsoon depression

Hurricane Bonnie's origins can be traced to a tropical wave that emerged off the west coast of Africa on June 23, tracked by the NHC. By June 25, the wave had become better defined: its limited shower and thunderstorm activity increased as it moved to the west-northwest toward the southernmost Windward Islands. Due to the threat the disturbance posed to the Windward Islands, it was designated as Potential Tropical Cyclone Two at 21:00 UTC on June 27. Around this time, NOAA Hurricane Hunters reconnaissance aircraft found an area of tropical storm-force winds, despite not finding a closed circulation.

As the system approached the Windward Islands, the mid-level circulation was displaced and convection was disoriented onto an east–west line. As it crossed the Windward Islands on the morning of June 29, the disturbance appeared like a tropical cyclone on conventional satellite data, displaying large bursts of convection near the center and prominent rainbands, speeding westward at 23 knots (26 mph; 43 km/h). However, observations from microwave data still displayed the wave as lacking a well-defined center or low-level structure. The disturbance then moved along the ABC Islands and northern coast of South America, producing heavy rainfall throughout the region from spiral rainbands.

Tropical Storm Bonnie making landfall near the Costa Rica–Nicaragua border on July 2

It then crossed the Guajira Peninsula of South America around 09:00 UTC on June 30. During and after this, the mid-levels of the disturbance became better defined, deep convection associated with the system persisted, and Air Force Hurricane Hunter reconnaissance data confirmed that the circulation had become well-defined. Hence, the disturbance became a tropical storm, receiving the name Bonnie on July 1 at 13:15 UTC. According to satellite imagery, the storm became better organized with deeper convection at the center. At 03:00 UTC on July 2, Bonnie made landfall just south of the Costa Rican border with Nicaragua. At the time, it had sustained winds of 60 mph (97 km/h). Following landfall, Bonnie moved through Central America, with the coldest clouds over the center.

At 15:00 UTC on July 2, Bonnie crossed over into the Pacific basin, becoming the first to survive the crossover from the Atlantic to the Pacific since Hurricane Otto in 2016. The well-defined center of circulation and banding persisted in the storm several hours later. Microwave imaging indicated that an inner core developed. Bonnie continued to organize, with satellite images showing a strong convective band on the western portions of the storm. Bonnie strengthened into a Category 1 hurricane on the Saffir–Simpson scale by July 4 just south of Salina Cruz, Oaxaca, making it the third hurricane of the Pacific hurricane season. Nine hours later, the ragged eye of the cyclone developed that was visible on satellite imagery. Later that day, Bonnie intensified into a Category 2 system as an inner core and distinct eye became apparent and upper-level outflow became fairly well-defined.

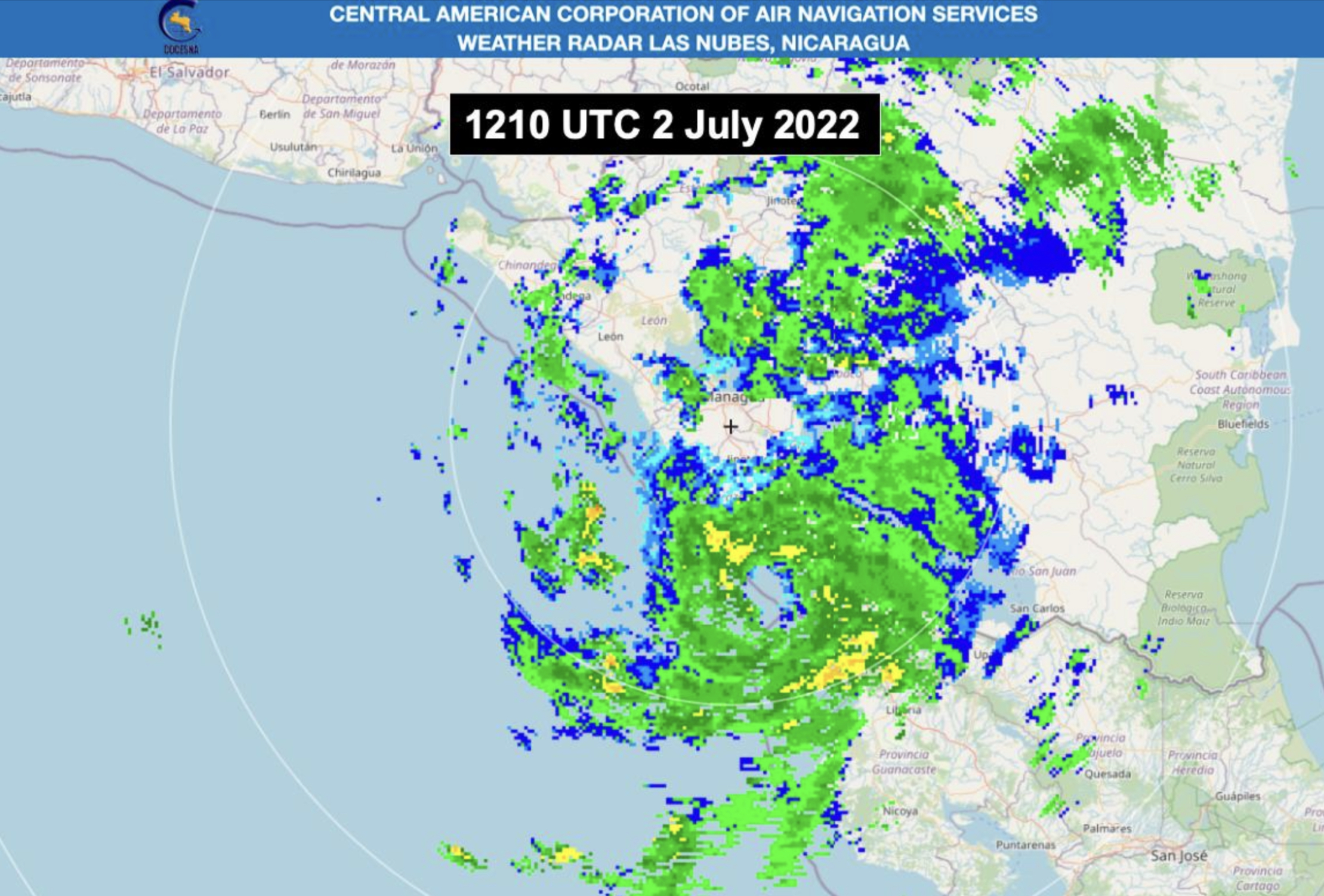
Radar reflectivity data from the Las Nubes, Nicaragua, radar of Tropical Storm Bonnie moving into the Pacific Ocean on July 2, 2022.

Further intensification was briefly halted by an increase of northerly to northeasterly wind shear overnight on July 4–5, but soon resumed, and at 15:00 UTC on July 5, Bonnie reached peak intensity as a Category 3 hurricane with maximum sustained winds of 115 mph (185 km/h) and a minimum central pressure of 964 mbar (28.5 inHg). Shortly afterward, Bonnie's cloud pattern deteriorated and its eye started to become less defined, causing the cyclone to weaken to a Category 2 strength by 03:00 UTC on July 6. Bonnie began to rapidly weaken due to wind shear and cooler waters. As a result, the hurricane weakened to Category 1 strength as it passed south of Clarion Island on July 7. The circulation center became embedded with a small central dense overcast to the north early on July 8, marking Bonnie's degradation to a tropical storm. At 21:00 UTC on July 9, Bonnie degenerated into a post-tropical cyclone. The remnant low moved westward and dissipated in the northern Pacific on July 11.

== Preparations and impacts ==
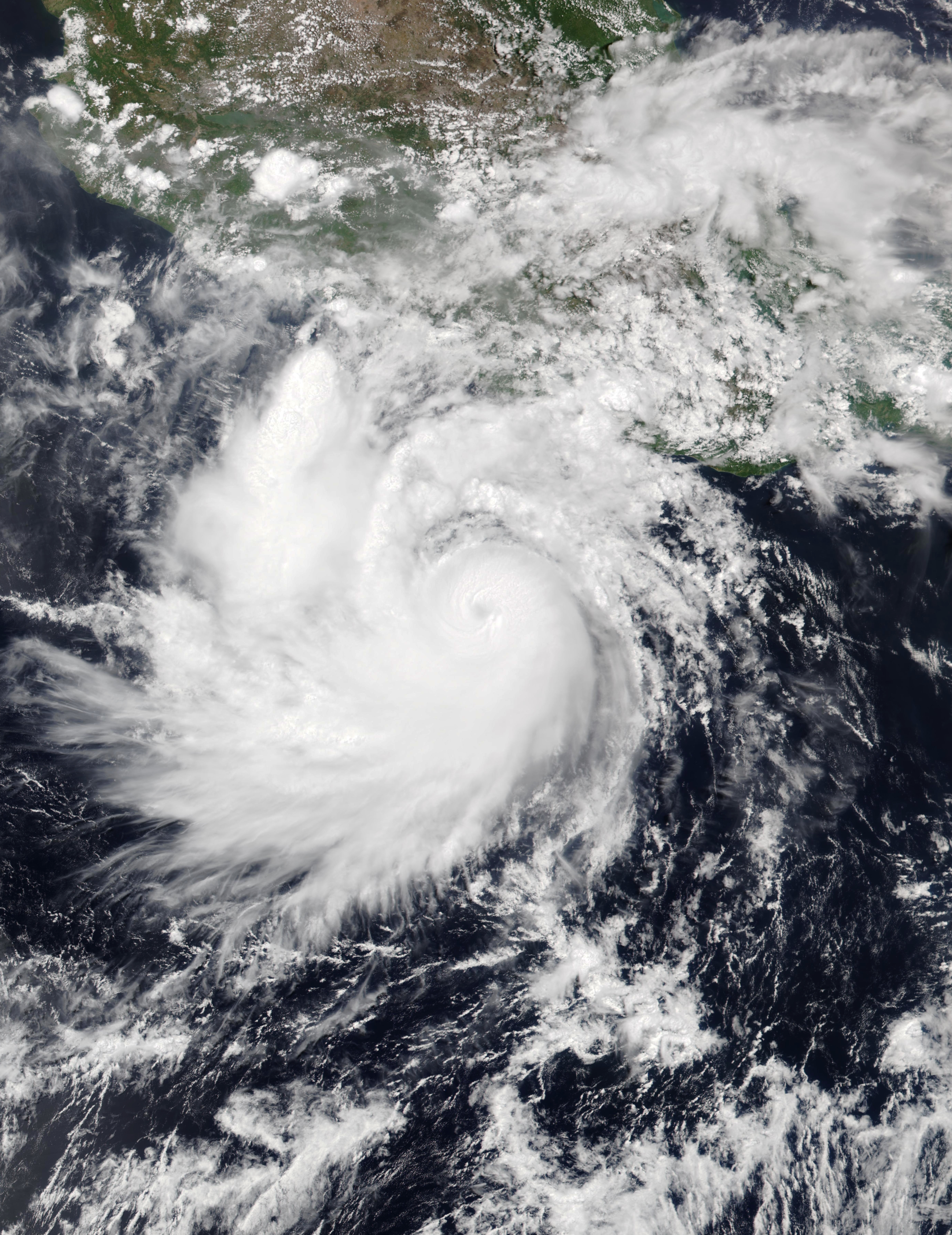
Hurricane Bonnie off the southern coast of Mexico on July 4

Upon designation as a potential tropical cyclone late on June 27, a Tropical Storm Warning was posted for Trinidad and Tobago and Grenada. These warnings were cancelled by 09:00 UTC on June 29.

=== Trinidad and Tobago ===
An orange level tropical storm warning was issued by the national meteorological office. Schools were closed on June 28 for non-CAPE students and were to resume the next day. Several domestic flights to and from the United States, Barbados, Guyana, Jamaica, Suriname, St. Maarten, and Curaçao by carrier Caribbean Airlines were cancelled or delayed. The government of Trinidad and Tobago considered allowing public sector employees to work remotely under weather alerts. Government buildings closed at noon on June 28, but several private businesses closed earlier. Ferry services to Tobago were called off and the last ferry to leave for San Fernando departed from Port of Spain on the afternoon of June 28. A total of 387 shelters were prepared for the storm, 712 municipal officers were deployed to ensure safety of vehicles parked at these facilities.

Trinidad and Tobago was left with mostly minimal damage from the potential tropical cyclone, with some areas receiving heavy rainfall and flash flooding. On the island of Tobago, emergency agencies received two reports of roof damage, four of downed trees, one of a vehicle accident, and a collapsed home. A 79-year-old woman who was inside the wooden home which collapsed on the morning of June 29 escaped unharmed but lost all belongings in her home which she had owned for over 20 years. Nesting sites of leatherback turtles at beaches in Grande Riviere were severely impacted by floodwaters, washing away thousands of eggs. At least 40 homes in the village were flooded; flooding up to 6 feet (1.8 m) deep scattered organic debris across the beach. Several mudslides and rockfalls occurred along a road linking the villages of Monte Video and Matelot. More than 200,000 customers nationwide lost access to drinking water, which affected 26 communities and several water treatment facilities.

=== Mexico ===
Hurricane Bonnie, as a Category 3 system, prompted Mexican authorities to issue warnings of heavy rainfall to the states of Colima, Guerrero, Jalisco, and Michoacán as it advanced inland. Authorities in Mexico warned of heavy rainfall in several states, and warned of waves of up to 3 to 5 meters in the coasts of the states of Oaxaca and Guerrero. Bonnie weakened to a Category 1 hurricane and was expected to become a tropical storm after going north, off the coasts of Cabo San Lucas, in the state of Baja California Sur.

=== Elsewhere ===
In Costa Rica, 3,572 people had been evacuated in different parts of the country to shelters, after registering flooding and landslides. Furthermore, 15 cantons were under a red alert, and 8,593 homes were left without power. Damages were at ₡250 million (US$365,000), though this was calculated before Bonnie struck the country.

In Grenada, electricity providers warned citizens to prepare for power outages and to not touch downed power lines.

In Chiriquí Province, Panama, several families were evacuated due to landslides and heavy rainfall.

In Colombia, the government warned the Island of San Andrés, while in neighboring Venezuela, classes and flights were suspended. Meanwhile, the governments of Nicaragua and Honduras issued alerts to their whole territories for the storm. In Nicaragua, authorities reported four deaths in relation to the storm. Bonnie was also responsible for one death in El Salvador as it emerged into the Pacific Basin.

== See also ==
- Weather of 2022
- Tropical cyclones in 2022
- Other storms of the same name
- List of Category 3 Pacific hurricanes
- List of Atlantic–Pacific crossover hurricanes
- List of Nicaragua hurricanes
