= Instituto Meteorológico Nacional =

The Instituto Meteorológico Nacional (IMN) is the national meteorological agency of Costa Rica.
