= Hurricanes in Central America =

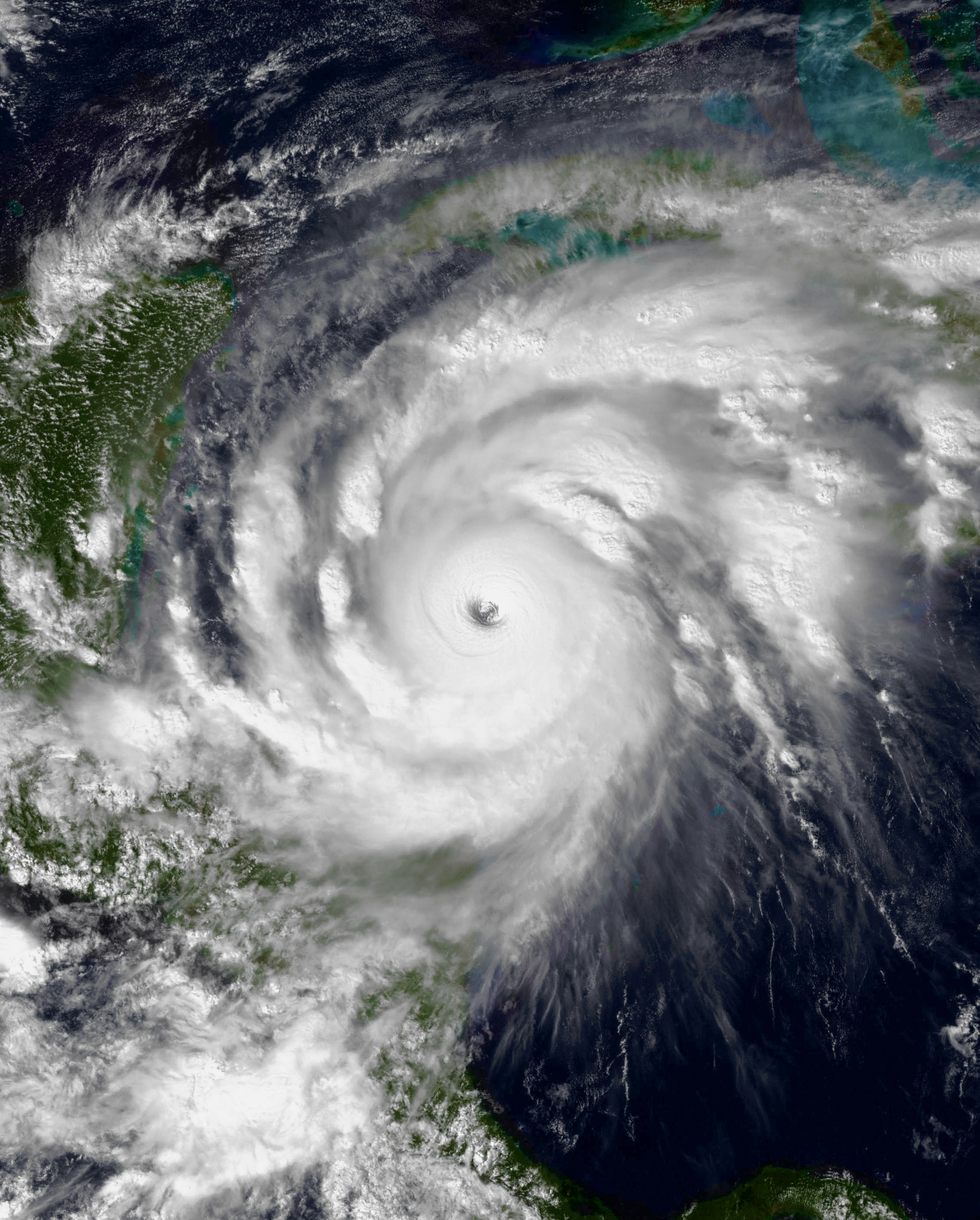
Hurricane Mitch at peak intensity to the northeast of Honduras

Central America is a region containing seven countries that connects the two continents of North America and South America.

== Hurricanes by country ==
=== Belize ===
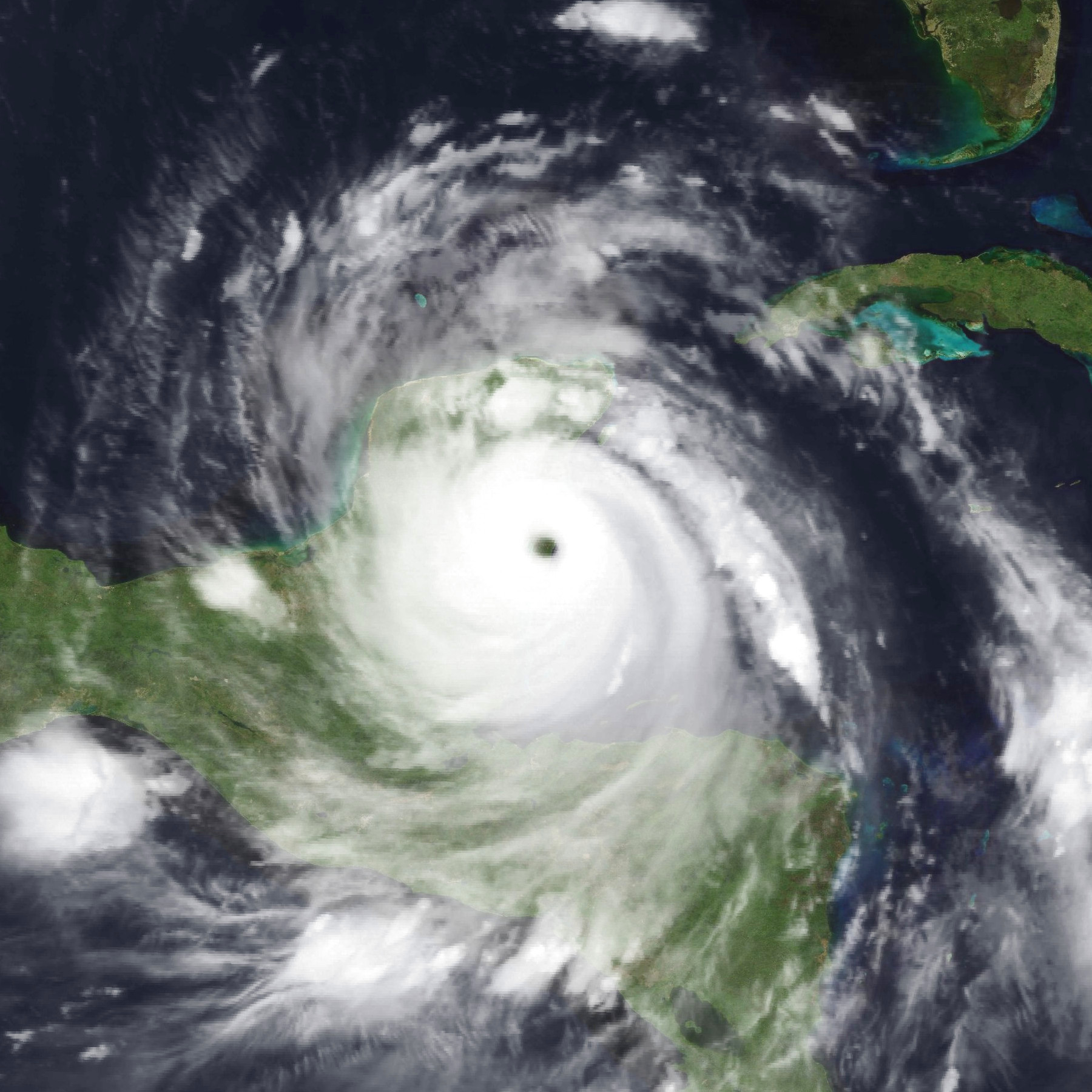
Hurricane Dean nearing landfall 25 miles north of Belize with winds of 175 miles an hour (280 km/h)

Belize is a low-lying country in Central America, with a population of about 383,000 people. Throughout history, Belize has been impacted by hundreds of tropical cyclones. The most recent hurricane to impact Belize was Hurricane Nana (2020).

Since records began in 1851, only two hurricanes have had Category 5 hurricane strength and have hit or hit close to Belize: Hurricane Janet in 1955 and Hurricane Dean in 2007.

=== Costa Rica ===
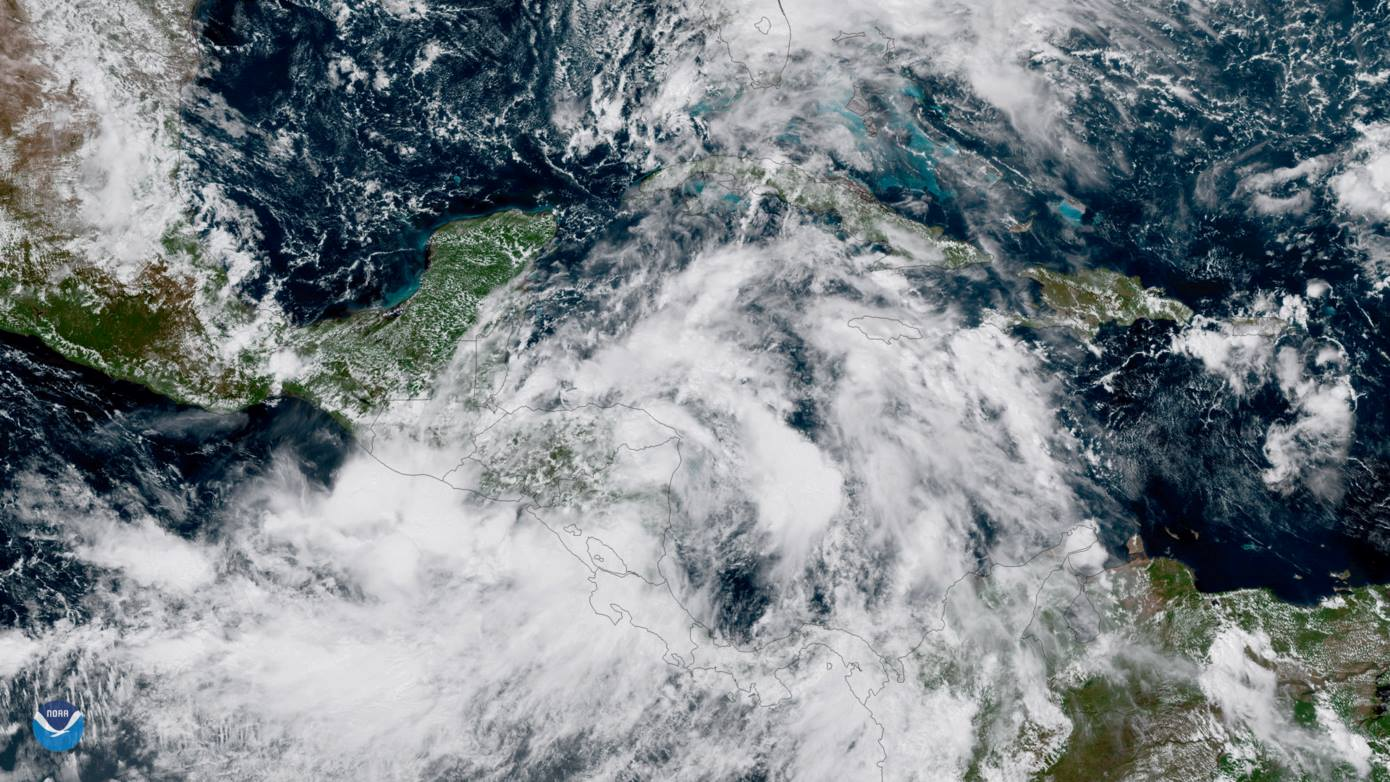
Tropical Storm Nate spreading heavy rain and strong winds over much of Central America, including Costa Rica.

Costa Rica is a country in Central America, bordered by Nicaragua to the north, the Caribbean Sea to the northeast, Panama to the southeast, the Pacific Ocean to the southwest, and Ecuador to the south of Cocos Island. It has a population of around 5 million in a land area of 51,060 square kilometers (19,714 square miles). Hurricanes are uncommon in this country; only eighteen have been recorded in history.

Climatologically, the hurricanes that impact Costa Rica mostly form in October and November. However, most of the hurricanes that hit the country were deadly and destructive, such as Hurricane Nate in 2017. Instituto Meteorológico Nacional (IMN) is the national meteorological agency of Costa Rica.

=== El Salvador ===
El Salvador is rarely affected by hurricanes, though Tropical Storm Agatha caused heavy rains and flooding in 2010.

=== Honduras ===
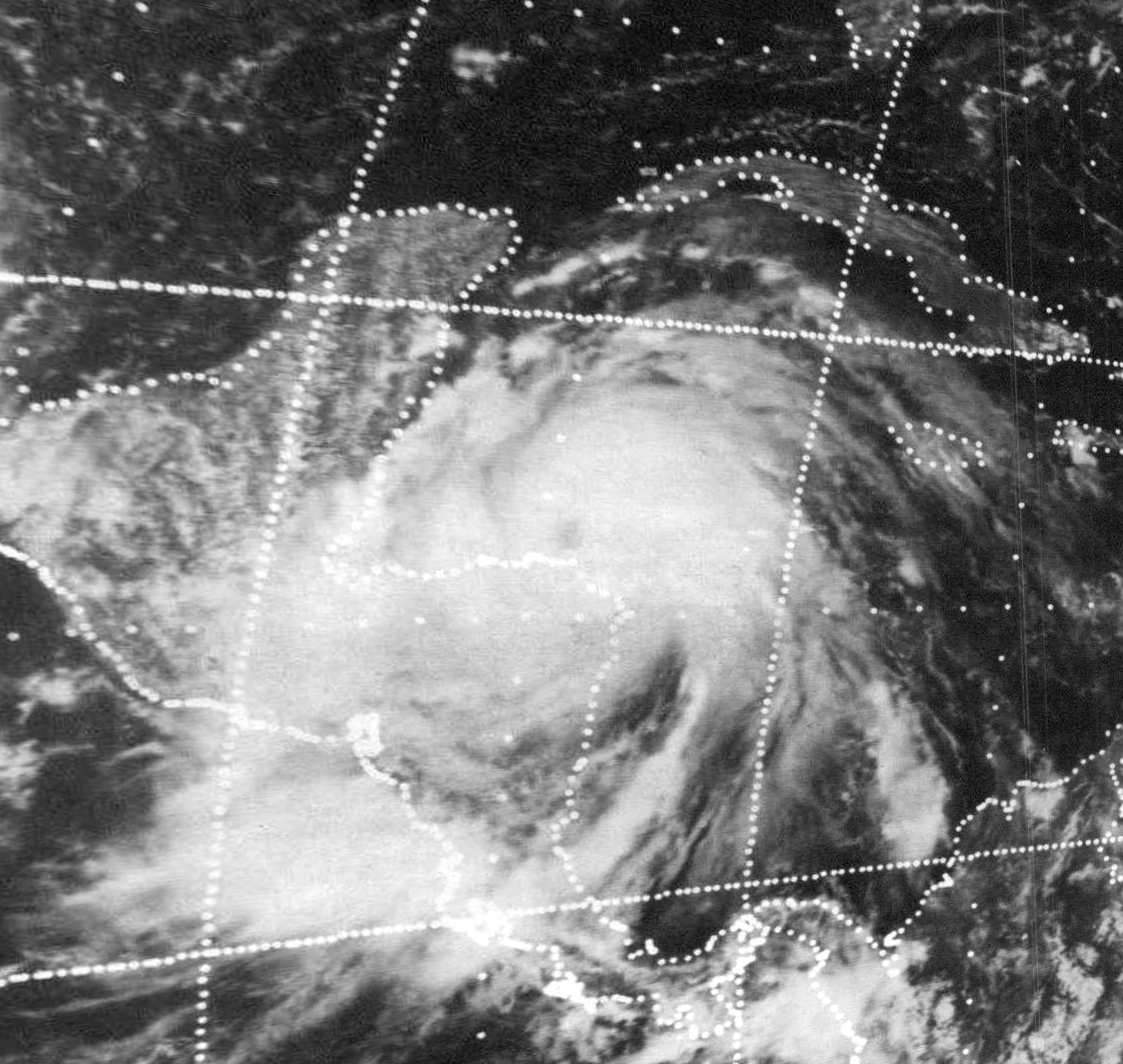
Hurricane Fifi at peak intensity just north of Honduras

Honduras is a country in Central America. To the north of Honduras are Guatemala and Belize, to the south is Nicaragua, to the west is El Salvador, and to the east is the Caribbean Sea.

=== Nicaragua ===
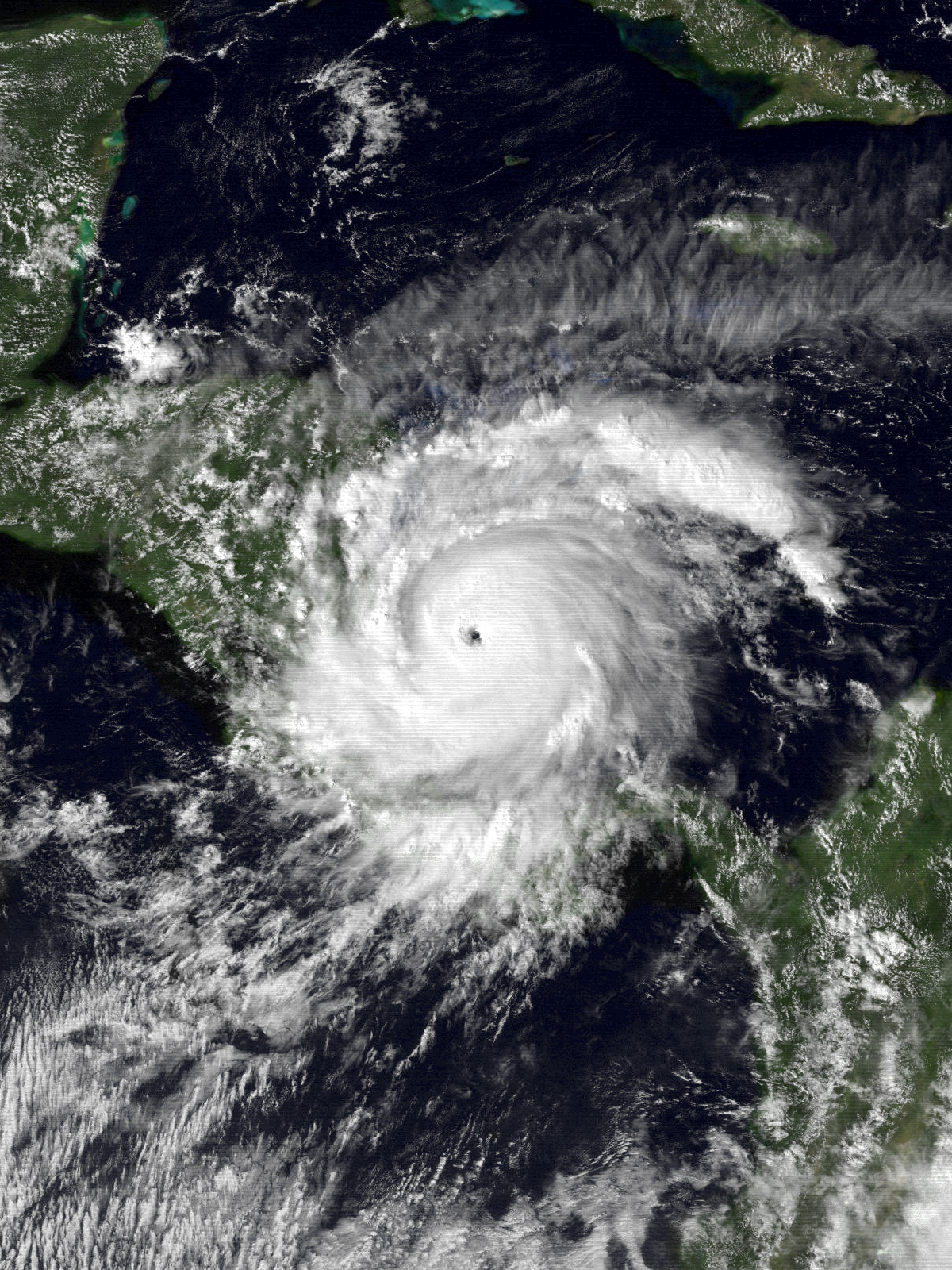
Hurricane Joan near peak intensity on October 21 southeast of Nicaragua

Nicaragua is the largest country in the Central American isthmus, bordered by Honduras to the northwest, the Caribbean Sea to the east, Costa Rica to the south, and the Pacific Ocean to the southwest. Tropical cyclones are common in the country, with an average of one storm a year. The coast is especially subject to destructive tropical storms and hurricanes, particularly from July through October. The high winds and floods accompanying these storms often cause considerable destruction of property. Hurricanes or heavy rains in the central highlands where agriculture is prevalent have destroyed much of the natural vegetation, causing considerable crop damage and soil erosion. One of the deadliest hurricanes to hit Nicaragua was Hurricane Mitch in 1998, which killed thousands.

=== Panama ===
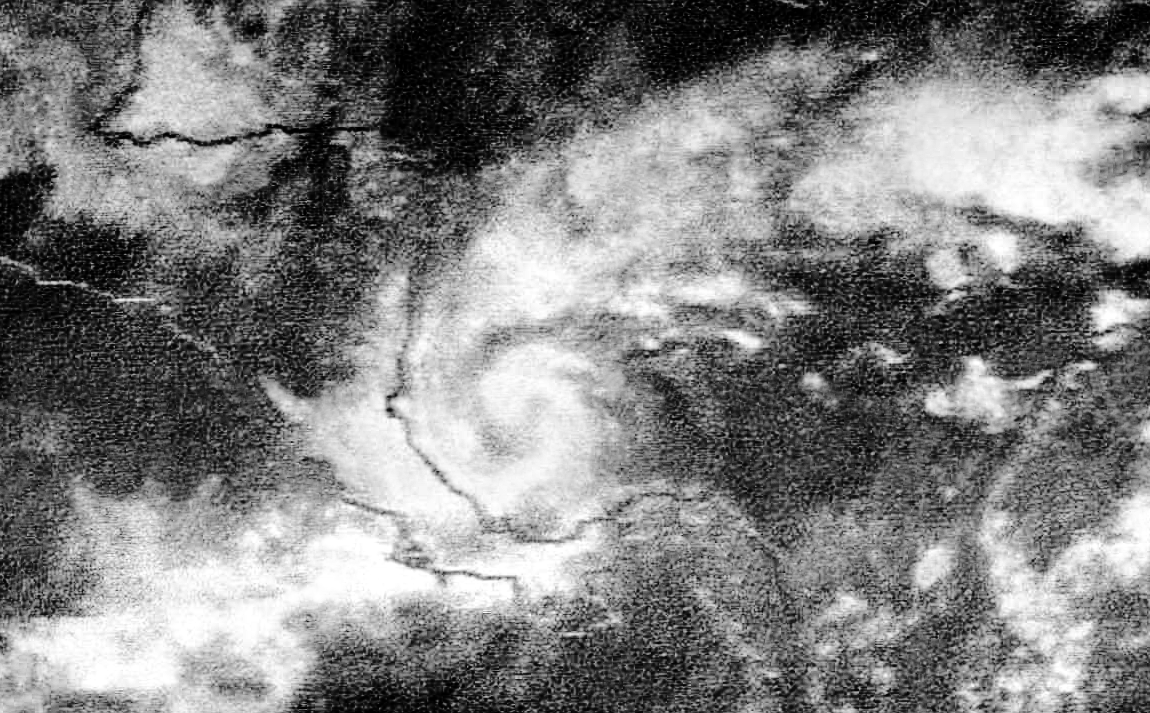
Hurricane Martha just north of Panama on November 21

Panama is a transcontinental country in Central America and South America, bordered by Costa Rica to the west, Colombia to the southeast, the Caribbean Sea to the north, and the Pacific Ocean to the south. Hurricanes are not common in Panama, as the country is outside of the Main Development Region.
