= San Blas Range =

Mountain range in Panama

Highest point
- Coordinates: 9°16′N 78°30′W

Geography
- Country: Panama

The San Blas Range (Spanish: Cordillera de San Blas or Serranía de San Blas) is a mountain range located in eastern Panama. It runs east and west parallel to the Caribbean coast and lies south of the San Blas Islands. This range is part of the Continental Divide of the Americas. The northern slopes are drained by numerous short rivers which flow into the Caribbean, while the southern slopes are drained by the Bayano River, which empties into the Pacific Ocean. The San Blas Range adjoins the Chagres Highlands on the west and continues to the southeast as the Serranía del Darién. It is one of the four mountain ranges in Panama. It is home to Cerro Cartí, measuring 748 meters.

The range intercepts moist northeasterly prevailing winds from the Caribbean Sea, resulting in a year-round wet climate on the Caribbean slope, with annual rainfall ranging from 2,500 to over 6,000 mm.

Lowland evergreen rain forest grows in the coastal lowlands, with submontane evergreen forest above 500 meters elevation and cloud forest on the highest-elevation ridges. The range is home to several threatened bird species, including the speckled antshrike, crested eagle, harpy eagle, great curassow, russet-crowned quail-dove, and blue-and-gold tanager. Native mammals found in the area include the giant anteater, silky anteater, northern naked-tailed armadillo, Geoffroy's tamarin, Panamanian night monkey, brown-headed spider monkey, Central American spider monkey, Panamanian spiny pocket mouse, capybara, crab-eating raccoon, neotropical river otter, ocelot, margay, jaguarundi, puma, jaguar, and Baird's tapir. Narganá Wilderness Area, managed by the indigenous Guna people, encompasses the northern slope of the range from its crest to the Caribbean coast.
