= Hurricane Otto =

Category 3 Atlantic hurricane in 2016

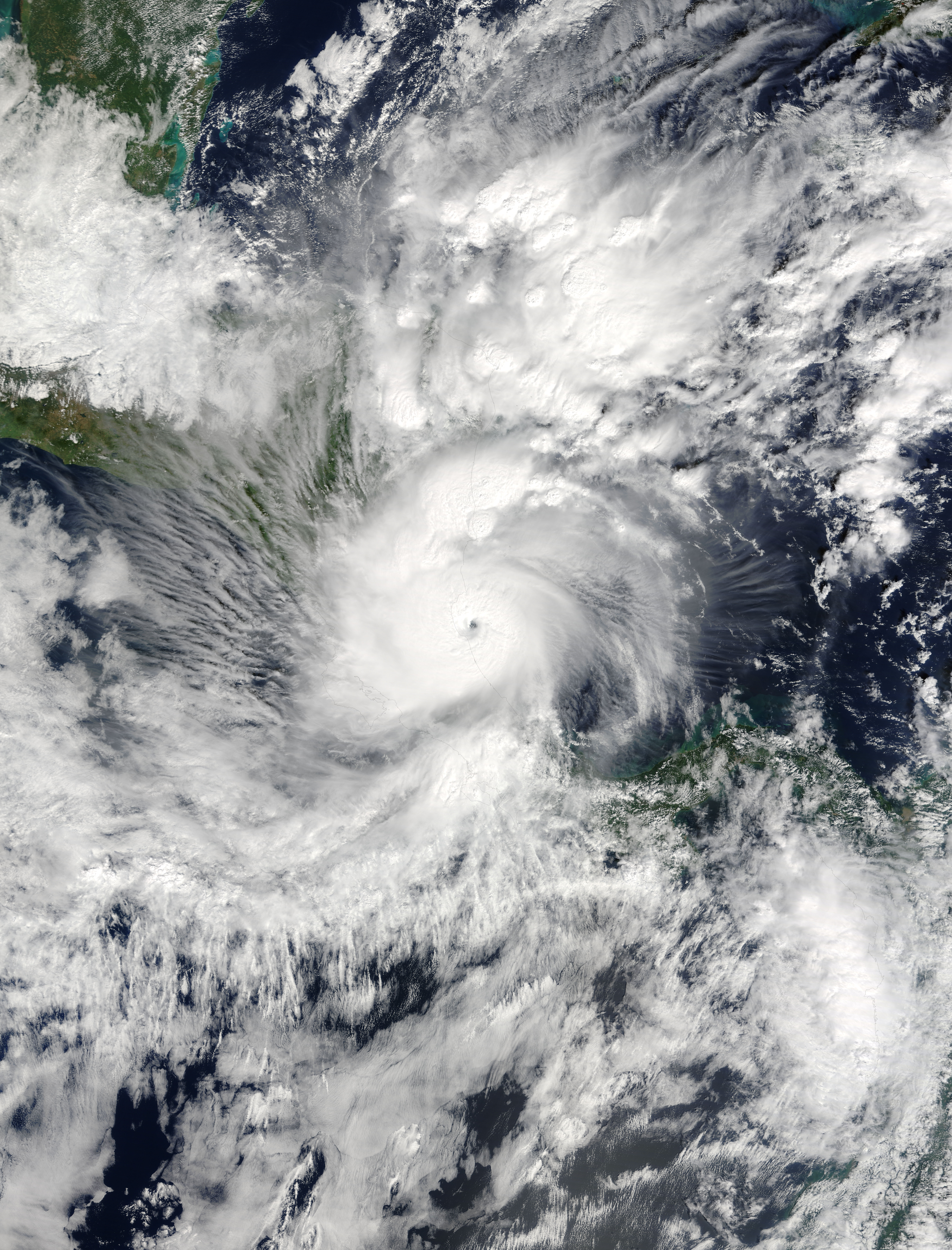
- Hurricane Otto at peak intensity shortly before landfall in Nicaragua on November 24

Meteorological history
- Formed: November 20, 2016
- Dissipated: November 26, 2016

Category 3 major hurricane
- 1-minute sustained (SSHWS/NWS)
- Highest winds: 115 mph (185 km/h)
- Lowest pressure: 975 mbar (hPa); 28.79 inHg

Overall effects
- Fatalities: 23 total
- Damage: $192 million (2016 USD)
- Areas affected: Panama, Costa Rica, Nicaragua
- IBTrACS
- Part of the 2016 Atlantic and Pacific hurricane seasons

Hurricane Otto was a strong late-season tropical cyclone that impacted parts of Central America in November 2016. It was the first Atlantic hurricane since Cesar–Douglas in 1996 to survive the crossover from the Atlantic Ocean to the Pacific Ocean. Forming late on November 20 in the southwestern Caribbean Sea, Otto was the fifteenth and final named storm, seventh hurricane and fourth major hurricane of the 2016 Atlantic hurricane season. It quickly intensified into a strong tropical storm the next day, and on November 23–24, rapidly strengthened into a Category 3 hurricane, the first in the month of November since Hurricane Paloma in 2008, and the latest date an Atlantic hurricane attained such intensity on record. Otto made landfall in Nicaragua at peak intensity on November 24, thus becoming the latest hurricane to make landfall in the Atlantic basin since 1851 when records began. Traveling along the Nicaragua–Costa Rica border, the system rapidly weakened to a tropical storm before emerging over the eastern Pacific Ocean, becoming the final storm of the 2016 Pacific hurricane season as well. Hostile environmental conditions inhibited reorganization, and Otto subsequently degenerated into an elongated trough on November 26.

The hurricane's unusually southern formation in the Caribbean Sea led to impacts in countries rarely affected by tropical cyclones. In particular, Panama and Costa Rica suffered extensive damage. The storm killed 23 people: 10 in Costa Rica, 9 in Panama, and 4 in Nicaragua. Otto also dropped torrential rainfall across the affected regions; some areas received up towards a month's worth of rain in only a matter of a day, which led to life-threatening flooding, which in turn led to landslides. After the storm had passed, recovery efforts began with the national mourning of the victims, followed by clean-up efforts. Overall, total economic losses from the hurricane exceeded US$190 million.

== Meteorological history ==
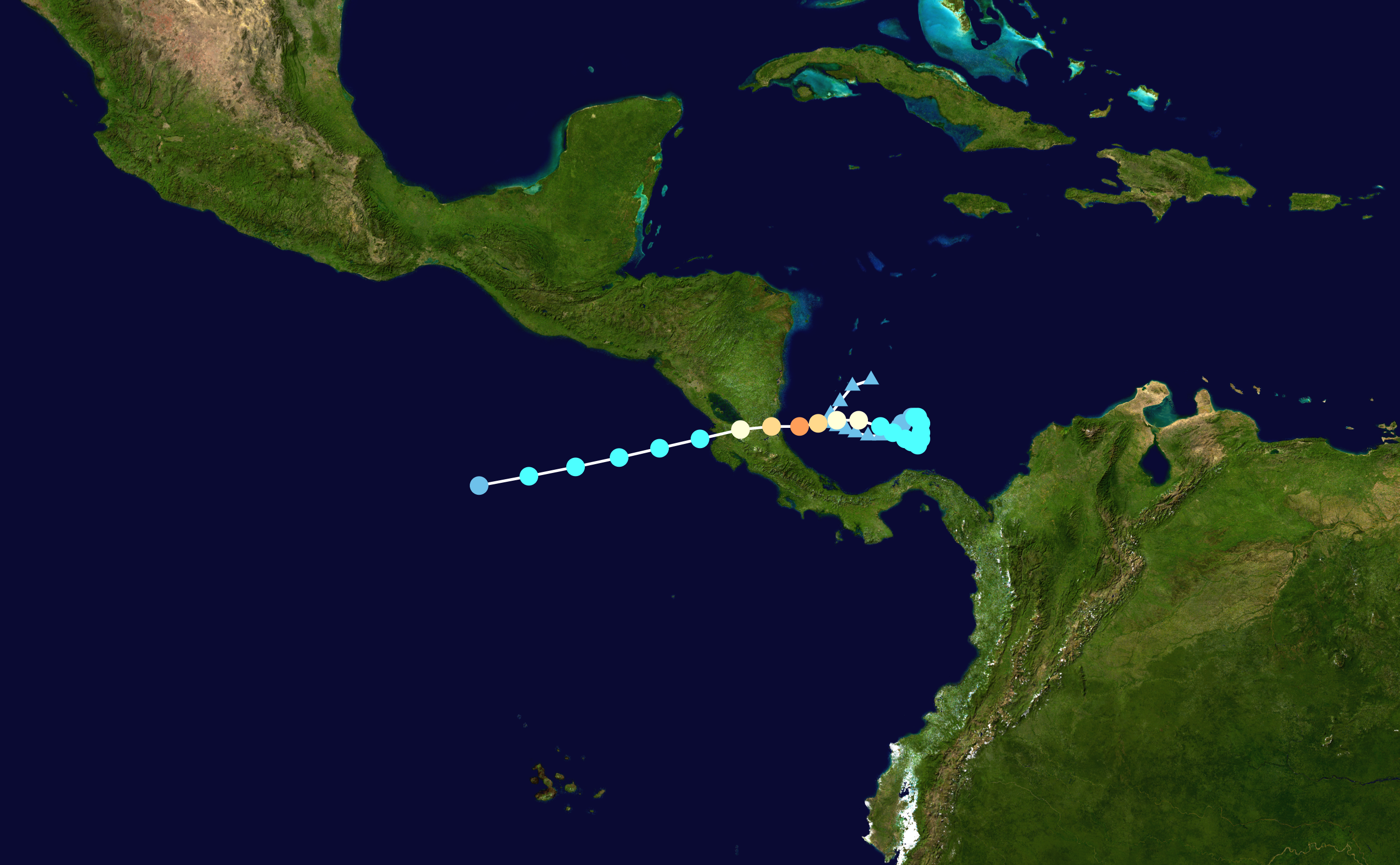
Map plotting the storm's track and intensity, according to the Saffir–Simpson scale Map key Saffir–Simpson scale Tropical depression (≤38 mph, ≤62 km/h) Tropical storm (39–73 mph, 63–118 km/h) Category 1 (74–95 mph, 119–153 km/h) Category 2 (96–110 mph, 154–177 km/h) Category 3 (111–129 mph, 178–208 km/h) Category 4 (130–156 mph, 209–251 km/h) Category 5 (≥157 mph, ≥252 km/h) Unknown Storm type Tropical cyclone Subtropical cyclone Extratropical cyclone, remnant low, tropical disturbance, or monsoon depression

On November 12, the National Hurricane Center (NHC) first noted the potential for a low pressure area to develop in the southwestern Caribbean Sea, assessing a low probability for tropical cyclone formation within five days. After a convectively coupled Kelvin wave and several nearby tropical waves interacted with each other in the aforementioned area, atmospheric pressure in that region began falling on November 14, resulting in a broad low pressure area forming north of Colombia on November 15. The low moved slowly and erratically, with a disorganized structure and light winds, disrupted by unfavorable upper-level conditions. On November 19, the convection increased and became better organized, amid marginally favorable conditions. The Hurricane Hunters flew into the system on November 20, observing a well-defined circulation, and the system became a tropical depression at 18:00 UTC that day.

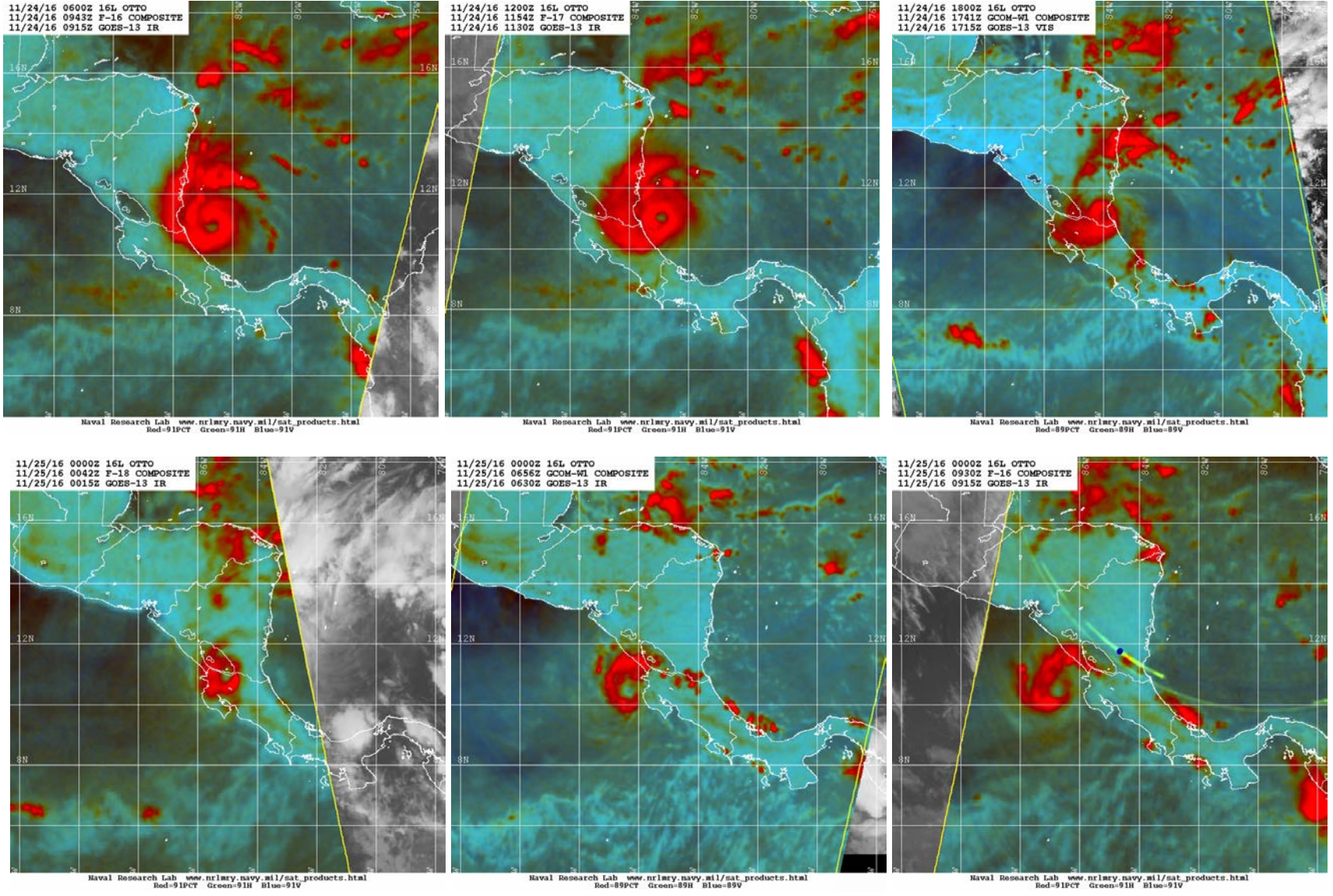
A series of microwave satellite images depicting the inner structure of Hurricane Otto as it traversed Central America. Note that despite crossing land, its eye remained largely intact.

The nascent depression meandered over the southwestern Caribbean Sea, its path to the north blocked by a ridge. Thunderstorm activity continued to pulse over the center, and the inner core of convection became more organized. The depression intensified into a tropical storm by 06:00 UTC on November 21, receiving the name Otto. The storm had well-established outflow to the northeast, fueled by warm water temperatures of around 84 °F (29 °C). After the convection organized into a central dense overcast, Otto became a strong tropical storm with 70 mph (110 km/h) winds, and maintained that intensity for about a day. On November 23, the storm reached hurricane intensity, and began a period of rapid intensification, reaching Category 2 intensity by 06:00 UTC the following day, with winds of 105 mph (169 km/h). Six hours later, Otto reached its peak intensity as a Category 3 major hurricane with winds of 115 mph (185 km/h), becoming the latest major hurricane on record in the satellite era. At 17:30 UTC, Otto made landfall over the Indio Maíz Biological Reserve in southeastern Nicaragua, roughly 12 miles (19 km) northwest of the Nicaragua–Costa Rica border at peak intensity. This marked the southernmost landfall of a hurricane in Central America since reliable records began, eclipsing Hurricane Irene–Olivia of 1971 by 30 to 35 miles (50 to 55 km).

After landfall, Otto's structure remained well-organized as it moved roughly parallel to the Costa Rica-Nicaraguan border, although cloud tops warmed, indicating diminishing convection. Despite moving over land, the hurricane's eye remained well-defined and intact as it traversed Nicaragua and Costa Rica. Otto was the first Atlantic hurricane on record to have its eye cross over Costa Rica, and the first hurricane-force system to traverse the nation. Around 03:30 UTC on November 25, the eye of Otto emerged over the Eastern Pacific near the Gulf of Papagayo, completing a rare crossover from the Atlantic to Eastern Pacific basin—the first such occurrence in which an Atlantic tropical cyclone retained its name, after a change in WMO naming policy in 2000. Concurrently, the system weakened to a tropical storm. Continuing to move westwards due to the influence of a subtropical ridge to its north, Otto steadily weakened as it moved away from Central America. Unfavorable environmental conditions hastened the system's demise, and Otto weakened to a tropical depression on November 26. Soon thereafter, the system degraded into a trough roughly 490 mi (790 km) south of Salina Cruz, Mexico. The remnant system continued to produce scattered convection for a few more days before dissipating entirely.

== Preparations ==
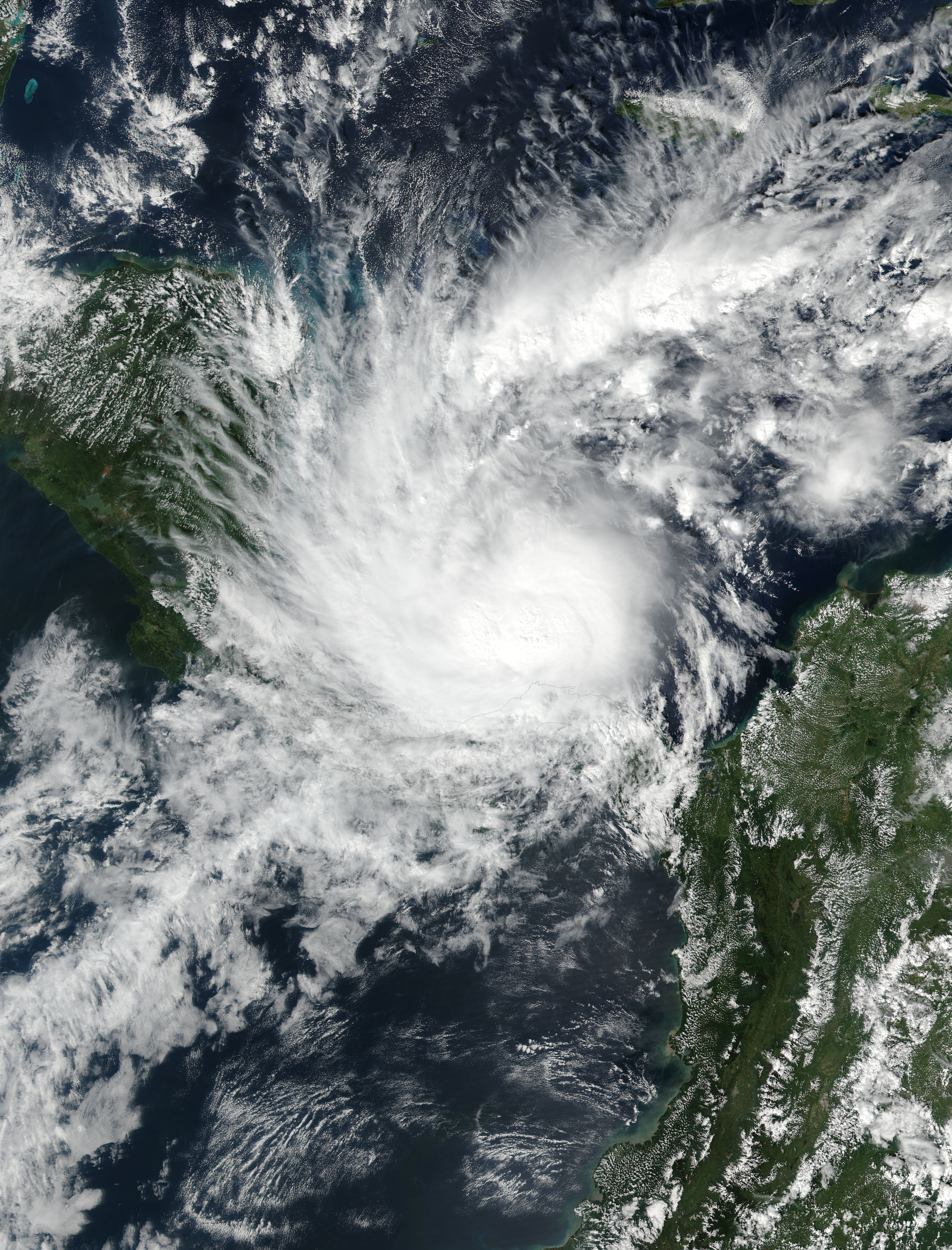
Tropical Storm Otto intensifying to the north of Panama on November 22

On November 22, Colombian authorities issued a tropical storm watch, later upgraded to a warning, for San Andrés. Beginning on the same day, officials in Panama, Costa Rica, and Nicaragua issued various tropical storm and hurricane watches and warnings from Nargana, Panama to near the mouth of the Río Grande de Matagalpa in Nicaragua. After it became likely that Otto would survive its trek across Central America, authorities issued a tropical storm warning for along the Pacific coast from Puntarenas, Costa Rica to Puerto Sandino, Nicaragua.

=== Panama ===
As far south as Panama in Bocas del Toro, preparations were made for the storm, even though Otto was not expected to make landfall in the region. Several patients were evacuated from hospitals. Panamanian president Juan Carlos Varela put the nation on "hurricane alert". In a press conference, Varela stated that up to 600 relief units had been prepared in advance. Classes were also suspended in all public and private schools nationwide. Swimming activities in the Caribbean Sea were prohibited.

=== Costa Rica ===
In Costa Rica, the government declared a red alert for the northern portion of the national territory and the southern Pacific region. About 6,800 people were evacuated to safer locations. Costa Rica president Luis Guillermo Solís also issued a state of emergency and advised all vehicles to stay off the roads, and that hospitals in the most at-risk areas were having their patients transferred somewhere else. He also advised that the hurricane could damage the agriculture supply in the nation.

=== Nicaragua ===
In Nicaragua, a yellow alert was issued for the South Caribbean Coast Autonomous Region, and the departments of Zeyala Central, Chontales, and Río San Juan. schools were closed for the coming days as Otto approached, and about 10,000 were in the process of being evacuated. Officials also feared that Otto could damage the nation's coffee crops, which were close to being able to be harvested fully.

== Impact ==
Infrared satellite loop of Hurricane Otto making landfall as a Category 3 hurricane in Nicaragua on November 24

=== Panama ===
The outer bands of Otto caused extensive damage in Panama; at least nine people died in various incidents related to the storm. High winds downed trees in Panama City, one of which fell on a car, killing a child. Landslides killed three people. Two people drowned while trying to cross a swollen, swift-moving river on the outskirts of Panama City. Offshore, the ship Jessica sank with six crew; three perished while the other three were rescued after clinging to inflatable rafts.

=== Nicaragua ===
Rainfall across Nicaragua generally amounted to 3 to 6 in (76 to 152 mm) in southern and southwestern portions of the country; a peak value of 6.35 in (161 mm) was observed in El Castillo. Throughout the country, Otto damaged 857 houses, eight schools, and two health facilities. The storm passage caused 11,678 people to stay in 152 temporary shelters. After the storm, 248 people remained in the shelters while their damaged houses were rebuilt. Otto damaged 1,700 m (5,600 ft) of power lines, resulting in power and water outages. Officials deployed 12,000 people to help ensure public safety and rescue efforts. There were four deaths in Nicaragua related to the hurricane, with five others missing as of November 26.

=== Costa Rica ===
The precursor to Otto affected Costa Rica since November 16, bringing torrential rainfall. Flooding was reported in Corredores, Coto Brus, Golfito, and Osa. Streets and residences were damaged by the floods. At least 7 schools were forced to briefly shut down.

Otto was the first hurricane to pass directly over Costa Rica since records began. In Costa Rica, some areas near the border with Nicaragua observed over a month's worth of rainfall; three-day accumulations exceeded 8 in (200 mm) in many areas. The highest recorded total was 12.11 in (308 mm) at the Miravalles Volcano. The National Meteorological Institute of Costa Rica reported that Otto killed at least ten people in the country, mostly from flash flooding and landslides, including six in Upala, three in Bagaces, and one in Guayabo. Costa Rican president Luis Guillermo Solis described the situation as "chaotic and unprecedented," with the worst effects in Upala canton. Authorities calculated at least ₡106 billion (US$192.2 million) in damages across the country, including ₡38 billion (US$68.9 million) in Upala canton, and another ₡19 billion (US$34.4 million) in Bagaces. The hurricane damaged 14 water systems. The hurricane caused approximately ₡8.1 billion (US$15 million) in damage to the coffee industry. The president declared three days of national mourning in the wake of the hurricane. Officials opened 38 shelters that housed 3,370 people, mostly in Upala.

== Aftermath ==
About 10,000 people required humanitarian assistance following the storm. Local Red Cross volunteers, police officers, and firefighters brought food and other supplies to the 42 communities left isolated due to Otto. By November 29, roads were repaired and cleared in most areas.

Because of the storm's significant impact in Central America, the name Otto was retired in March 2017 by the World Meteorological Organization, and will never again be used as a storm name in the Atlantic basin. It was replaced with Owen for the 2022 Atlantic hurricane season.

== See also ==
- Tropical cyclones in 2016
- List of Category 3 Atlantic hurricanes
- List of Eastern Pacific tropical storms
- Hurricane Martha (1969) – A late-season Category 1 hurricane that struck Panama as a tropical storm.
- Hurricane Joan–Miriam (1988) – Another late-season Category 4 hurricane which crossed from the Atlantic to the East Pacific as a tropical storm.
- Hurricane Beta (2005) – A Category 3 hurricane that struck Nicaragua at Category 2 strength in late October.
- Hurricane Felix (2007) – An intense Category 5 hurricane that caused 130 fatalities in Nicaragua.
- Tropical Storm Hermine (2010) – A tropical storm that originated in the East Pacific basin and eventually crossed over into the Gulf of Mexico.
- Hurricane Nate (2017) – A Category 1 hurricane which also caused significant damage in Central America as a tropical storm.
- Hurricane Eta (2020) – A late-season Category 4 hurricane that devastated Nicaragua.
- Hurricane Iota (2020) – A late-season hurricane that made landfall in Nicaragua as a Category 4.
- Hurricane Bonnie (2022) – A tropical storm that became the first crossover storm since Otto.
- Hurricane Julia (2022) – Another Atlantic hurricane which had a similar track and crossed over to the Pacific as a tropical storm, the second in 2022.
