= Ectopoglossus astralogaster =

Conservation status
- Data Deficient (IUCN 3.1)

Scientific classification
- Kingdom: Animalia
- Phylum: Chordata
- Class: Amphibia
- Order: Anura
- Family: Dendrobatidae
- Genus: Ectopoglossus
- Species: E. astralogaster

Binomial name
- Ectopoglossus astralogaster (Myers, Ibáñez, Grant & Jaramillo, 2012)
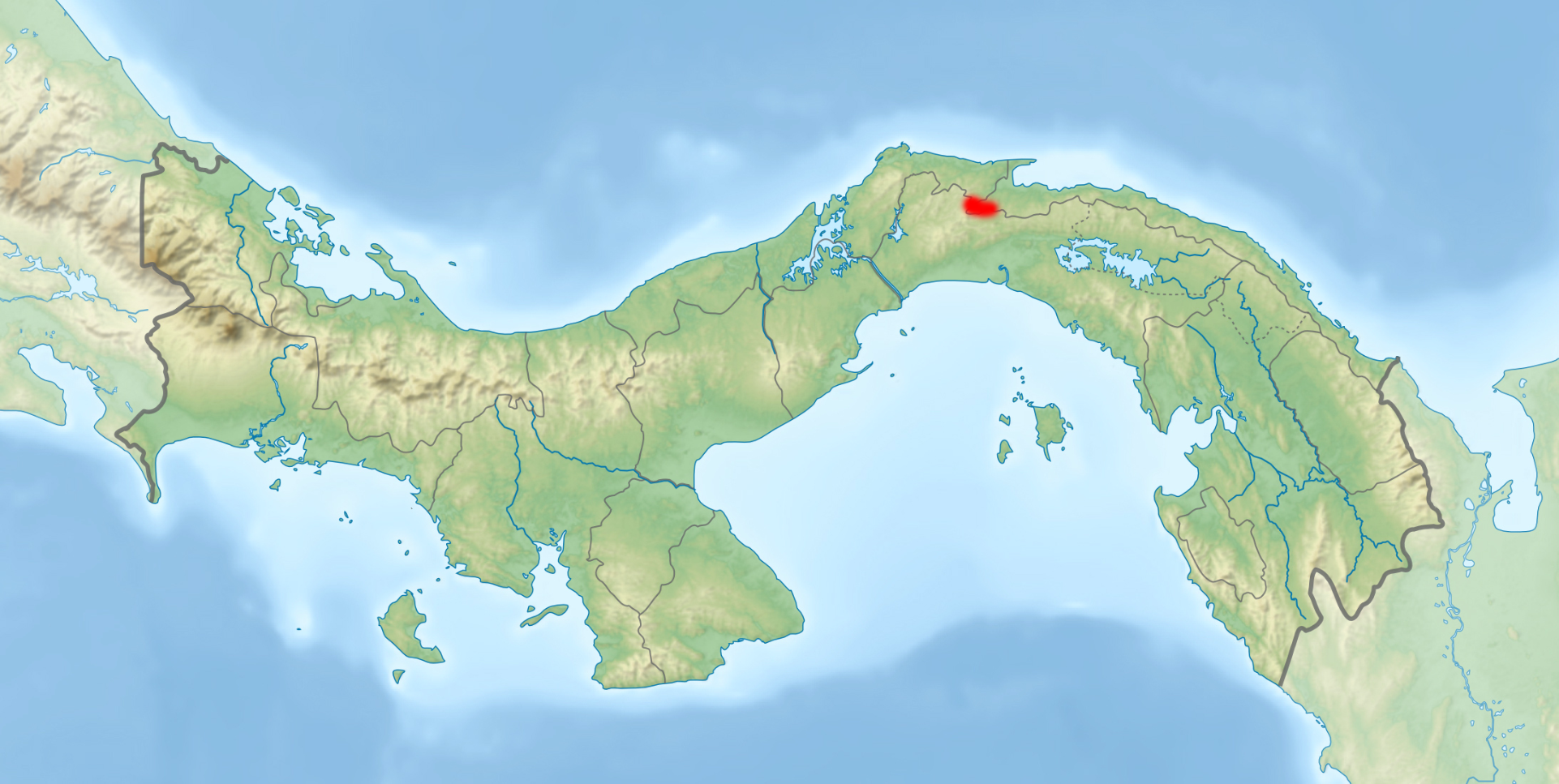
- Distribution of Ectopoglossus astralogaster

Species of frog

Ectopoglossus astralogaster is a sparsely-researched species of frog in the family Dendrobatidae. It is known to only be endemic to premontane forests on Cerro Brewster in the western part of Guna Yala, in Panama, at 700 to 900 meters above sea level.

== Description ==
Ectopoglossus astralogaster is yellowish-brown in coloration, with darker brown markers and white spots on the ventral areas. Researchers collected one adult female specimen, measuring 22 mm long in snout-vent length.

== Etymology ==
Scientists named this frog using the Greek words astralos for "spotted" and gaster for "stomach." Collectively, they are "starry belly."

== Habitat ==
Scientists saw the frog near streams in premontane forests between 700 and 900 meters above sea level.

The frog's range is near Chagres National Park, but it has yet to be observed inside it.

== Threats ==
The IUCN classifies this frog as data deficient. They infer that its range may include any of a few protected parks, but it has not been formally confirmed within any.
