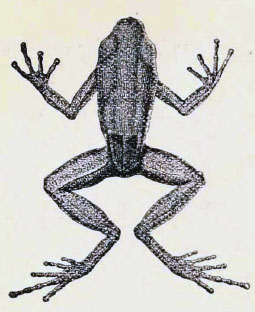
- Holotype from Boulenger's original species description

Conservation status
- Endangered (IUCN 3.1)

Scientific classification
- Kingdom: Animalia
- Phylum: Chordata
- Class: Amphibia
- Order: Anura
- Family: Dendrobatidae
- Genus: Paruwrobates
- Species: P. whymperi

Binomial name
- Paruwrobates whymperi (Boulenger, 1882)

Synonyms
- Protherapis Whymperi Boulenger, 1882; Colostethus whymperi (Boulenger, 1882); Hyloxalus whymperi (Boulenger, 1882)

= Paruwrobates whymperi =

Tanti rocket frog

Species of frog

Paruwrobates whymperi, sometimes known as the Tanti rocket frog, is a species of frog in the family Dendrobatidae. It is endemic to west-central Ecuador and only known from Tanti (a farm, the type locality), near San Francisco de Las Pampas, and from Mindo, Pichincha Province.

== Etymology ==
Paruwrobates whymperi is named after Edward Whymper, who collected the holotype during his expedition to Ecuador in 1879–1880.

== Taxonomy ==
The holotype from Tanti is in poor condition, allowing describing few characters precisely. Frogs from Francisco de Las Pampas resemble the holotype and the original description, but until fresh material from the type locality are obtained, their true identity remains uncertain. It may be the same species as Paruwrobates erythromos (Vigle & Miyata, 1980), although the latter is a different species from the specimens from Francisco de Las Pampas.

== Description ==
Males measure 21–23 mm (0.83–0.91 in) in snout–vent length and have moderately robust body (adult females are unknown). Abdomen is black with white spots. Skin on all surfaces is smooth.

== Habitat and conservation ==
Its natural habitats are very humid premontane forests at elevations of 600–1,800 m (2,000–5,900 ft) above sea level. Breeding habitat is unknown but presumably the tadpoles develop in streams. It is threatened by habitat loss caused by agriculture and logging.
