= Ectopoglossus =

Scientific classification
- Kingdom: Animalia
- Phylum: Chordata
- Class: Amphibia
- Order: Anura
- Family: Dendrobatidae
- Subfamily: Hyloxalinae
- Genus: Ectopoglossus; Grant et al., 2017

Species
- 6, see text

Genus of amphibians

Ectopoglossus is a genus of frogs in the subfamily Hyloxalinae, of the family Dendrobatidae.

== Species ==
- Ectopoglossus absconditus Grant, Rada, Anganoy-Criollo, Batista, Dias, Jeckel, Machado & Rueda-Almonacid, 2017
- Ectopoglossus astralogaster (Myers, Ibáñez, Grant & Jaramillo, 2012)
- Ectopoglossus atopoglossus (Grant, Humphrey & Myers, 1997)
- Ectopoglossus confusus (Myers & Grant, 2009)
- Ectopoglossus isthminus (Myers, Ibáñez, Grant & Jaramillo, 2012)
- Ectopoglossus lacrimosus (Myers, 1991)
- Ectopoglossus saxatilis Grant, Rada, Anganoy-Criollo, Batista, Dias, Jeckel, Machado & Rueda-Almonacid, 2017
