= Ectopoglossus atopoglossus =

Conservation status
- Critically Endangered (IUCN 3.1)

Scientific classification
- Kingdom: Animalia
- Phylum: Chordata
- Class: Amphibia
- Order: Anura
- Family: Dendrobatidae
- Genus: Ectopoglossus
- Species: E. atopoglossus

Binomial name
- Ectopoglossus atopoglossus (Grant, Humphrey, and Myers, 1997)
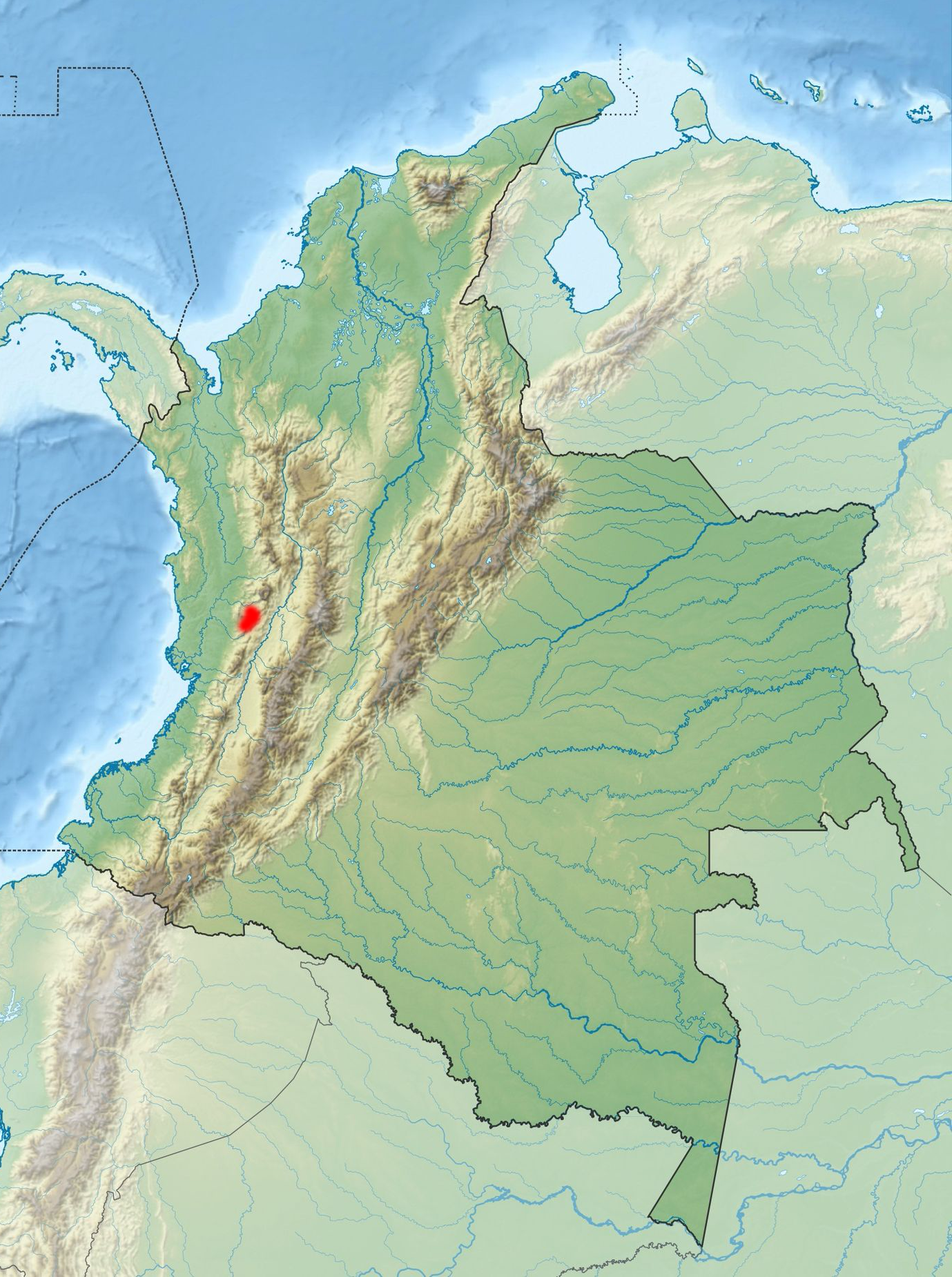
- Distribution of Ectopoglossus atopoglossus

Synonyms
- Colostethus atopoglossus Grant, Humphrey, and Myers, 1997; Anomaloglossus atopoglossus (Grant, Humphrey, and Myers, 1997)

Species of frog

Ectopoglossus atopoglossus is a species of frog in the family Dendrobatidae. It is endemic to Colombia and only known from its type locality in the Cordillera Occidental, on the border between the departments of Valle del Cauca and Chocó.

== Habitat ==
This frog has been observed in swamps and near heavily vegetated streams in lowland and premontane forests between 1000 and 2260 meters above sea level.

Scientists believe this frog might exist inside Reserva Natural Cerro El Ingles.

== Reproduction ==
Male frogs perch on plants in the water or on rocks near water and call to the female frogs. Scientists infer that the tadpoles swim in streams.

== Threats ==
The IUCN classifies this frog as critically endangered. It is threatened by habitat loss from agriculture expansion, water pollution, fumigation of illegal crops and timber extraction. Searches in 1997 found no sign of this species so the current population status is unknown. Very little else is known about this species. It is known next to a stream in sub-Andean forest.
