= Ectopoglossus absconditus =

Conservation status
- Data Deficient (IUCN 3.1)

Scientific classification
- Kingdom: Animalia
- Phylum: Chordata
- Class: Amphibia
- Order: Anura
- Family: Dendrobatidae
- Genus: Ectopoglossus
- Species: E. absconditus

Binomial name
- Ectopoglossus absconditus (Grant, Rada, Anganoy-Criollo, Batista, Dias, Jeckel, Machado & Rueda-Almonacid, 2017)
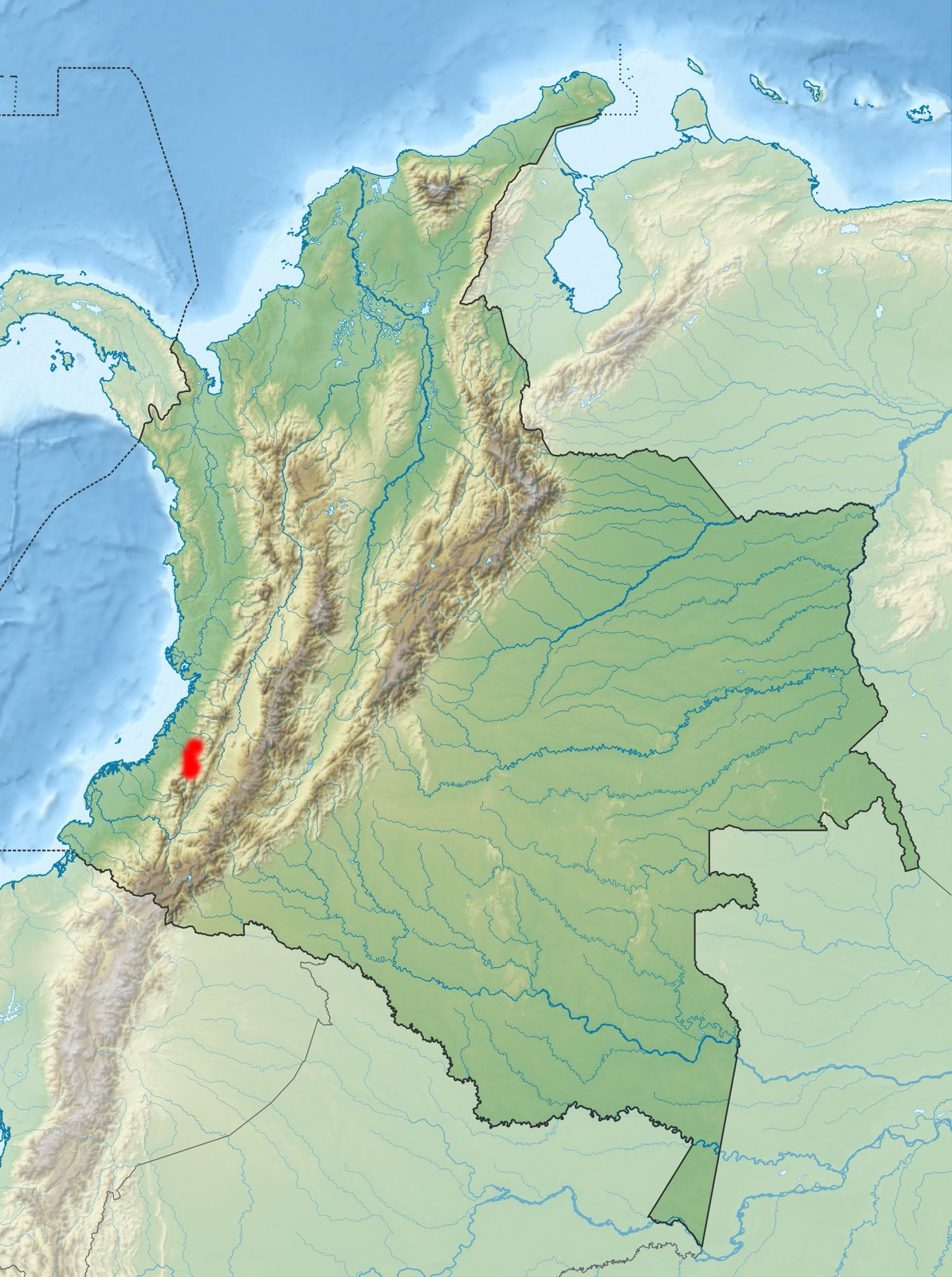
- Distribution of Ectopoglossus absconditus

Species of frog

Ectopoglossus absconditus is a sparsely-researched species of frog in the family Dendrobatidae. It is known to only be endemic to Cordillera Occidental, Cauca Department, Colombia.

Scientists know this frog from three individuals discovered in 1938 and 1939. They were found in humid forests on hills between 800 and 900 meters above sea level.

The IUCN classifies this frog as data deficient. Specimens were found near Parque Nacional Natural Munchique, and scientists believe it may live within this protected park.

== Original description ==
- Grant T; Rada M; Anganoy-Criollo M; Batista A; Dias PH; Jeckel AM; Machado DJ; Rueda-Almonacid JV (2017). "Phylogenetic systematics of dart-poison frogs and their relatives revisited (Anura: Dendrobatoidea)". South American Journal of Herpetology (Abstract). 12 (1): S1–S90.
