= Narganá Wilderness Area =

Protected area in Panama

- Área Silvestre de Narganá
- Interactive map of Narganá Wilderness Area
- Location: Guna Yala, Panama
- Coordinates: 9°23′40″N 78°47′30″W
- Area: 954.14 km^{2} (368.40 sq mi)
- Designated: 1994
- Governing body: Indigenous peoples
- Administrator: Ministerio de Ambiente

Nargana Wilderness Area is a 954.14 square kilometres (368.40 mi^{2}) reserve in Guna Yala, Panama run by the Guna people. The reserve extends from the Caribbean Sea coast to the crest of the Cordillera de San Blas, which forms part of the Continental Divide of the Americas. It borders Chagres National Park on the west.

Lowland evergreen rain forest grows in the coastal lowlands, with submontane evergreen forest above 500 meters elevation and cloud forest on the highest-elevation ridges. It is known for its bird watching opportunities and is home to black-crowned antpitta, speckled antshrike, and red-throated caracara.

== See also ==
- Protected areas of Panama
