= La Planada poison frog =

Conservation status
- Critically endangered, possibly extinct (IUCN 3.1)
- CITES Appendix II

Scientific classification
- Kingdom: Animalia
- Phylum: Chordata
- Class: Amphibia
- Order: Anura
- Family: Dendrobatidae
- Genus: Paruwrobates
- Species: P. andinus

Binomial name
- Paruwrobates andinus (Myers & Burrowes, 1987)

Synonyms
- Epipedobates andinus Myers & Burrowes, 1987; Dendrobates andinus (Myers & Burrowes, 1987); Ameerega andina (Myers & Burrowes, 1987)

Species of amphibian

The La Planada poison frog (Paruwrobates andinus) is a species of frog in the family Dendrobatidae endemic to Colombia. Its natural habitats are subtropical or tropical moist montane forests and rivers. It is threatened by habitat loss, and listed as critically endangered by IUCN.
