= Ectopoglossus confusus =

Conservation status
- Endangered (IUCN 3.1)

Scientific classification
- Kingdom: Animalia
- Phylum: Chordata
- Class: Amphibia
- Order: Anura
- Family: Dendrobatidae
- Genus: Ectopoglossus
- Species: E. confusus

Binomial name
- Ectopoglossus confusus (Myers & Grant, 2009)
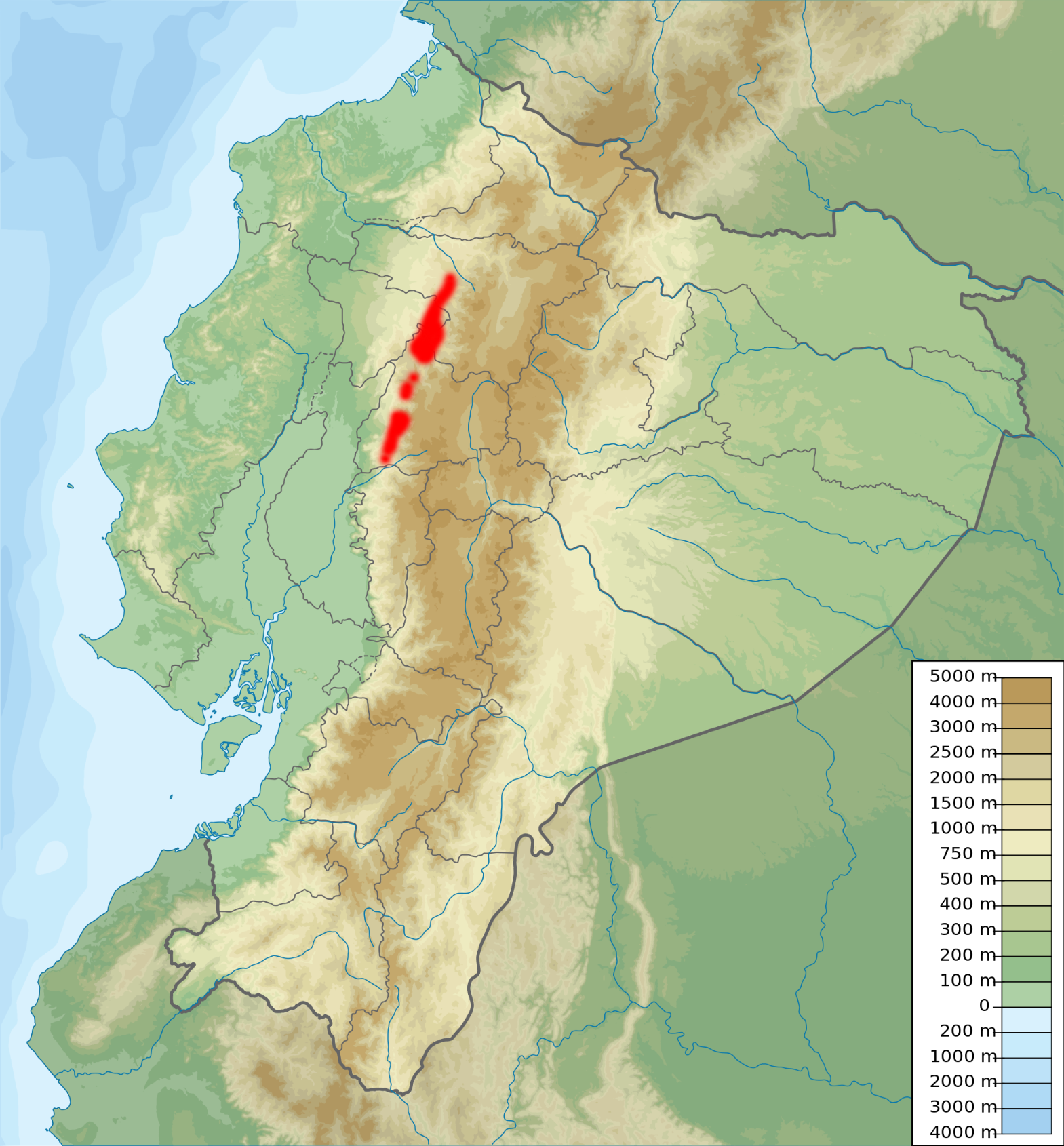
- Distribution of Ectopoglossus confusus

Synonyms
- Anomaloglossus confusus Myers, 2009

Species of frog

Ectopoglossus confusus, the confusing rocket frog, is a species of frog in the family Dendrobatidae. It is endemic to Rio Junin, Imbabura Province, Ecuador on the western slopes of the Andes mountains and can be found in rocky streams in lower montane rainforest and has a severely declining population from copper mining in the region. There have been efforts to protect the Confusing Rocket Frog and other species of the region from mining, and movements to urge the government of Ecuador to stop allowing mining to occur.

== Description ==
Scientists described this species based on one male adult and six female adults. The male measured 21.7 mm in snout-vent length and six female frogs measured 23–26 mm. The skin of the frog's back can appear blackish or dark green, depending on the light. It has light brown or bronze spots. There are bars across the legs. There is some blue color on the front legs. The throat and venter are light blue in color. The iris of the eye is light bronze or green in color with black reticulations. The ventral surfaces of the legs are gray-brown in color with some orange.

== Habitat ==
This diurnal frog has been found near clear, rocky streams on mountains between 600 and 1700 meters above sea level. Its habitat sees between 2000 and 4000 mm of rainfall per annum.

Its range includes the Reserva Ecológica Los Ilinizas, but no conservation specific to the species can be found there.

== Threats ==
The IUCN classifies this frog as endangered. Forest fragmentation is a principal threat. Humans have cut down forests for timber and in favor of cattle grazing and agriculture. The fungal disease chytridiomycosis has been detected in frogs in this species' range.

== Original description ==
- Myers CW; Grant T (2009). "Anomaloglossus confusus, a new Ecuadorian frog formerly masquerading as Colostethus chocoensis (Dendrobatoidea: Aromobatidae)". Am Mus Novit. 3659: 1–12.
