= Ectopoglossus saxatilis =

Conservation status
- Data Deficient (IUCN 3.1)

Scientific classification
- Kingdom: Animalia
- Phylum: Chordata
- Class: Amphibia
- Order: Anura
- Family: Dendrobatidae
- Genus: Ectopoglossus
- Species: E. saxatilis

Binomial name
- Ectopoglossus saxatilis (Grant, Rada, Anganoy-Criollo, Batista, Dias, Jeckel, Machado & Rueda-Almonacid, 2017)
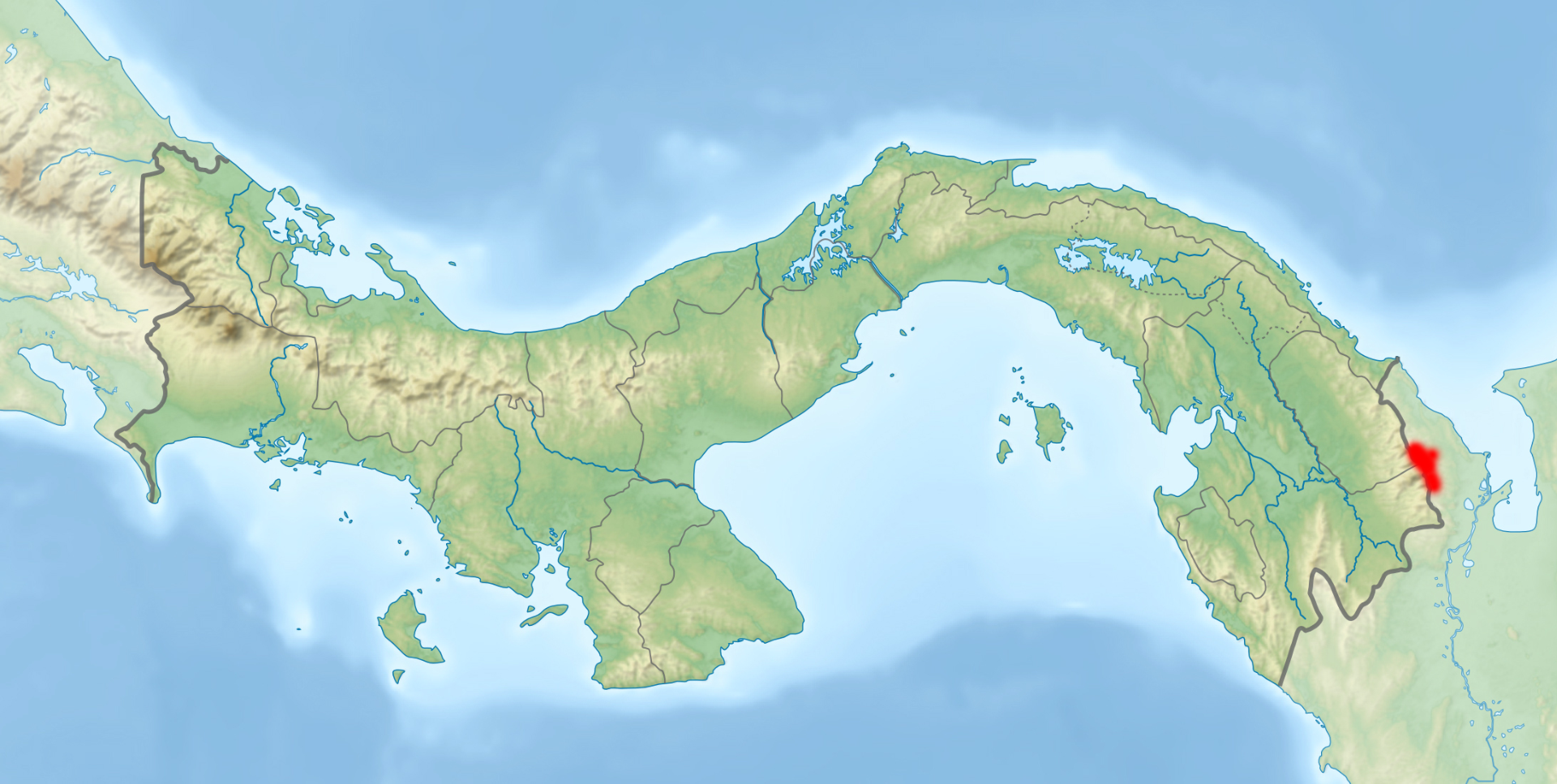
- Distribution of Ectopoglossus saxatilis

Species of frog

Ectopoglossus saxatilis is a species of frog in the family Dendrobatidae. It is known to be endemic to a small tributary of the Río Tanelita on the Colombian side of Cerro Tacarcuna, where it can be found in small streams and caves in the humid forests of the region, at around 1100 meters above sea level. Scientists suspect it may live in nearby Panama as well.

== Habitat and range ==
This diurnal frog has been observed near streams, in the spray zone of waterfalls, and in one cave. While it has not been observed inside any protected areas, its range comes near Parque Nacional Los Katios in Colombia and Darien National Park in Panama.

== Description ==
Ectopoglossus lacrimosus is brown in coloration, with golden-brown spots. The only measured specimen was a 24.6 mm long female.

== Threats ==
The IUCN classifies this species as data deficient. Its range is in remote areas that are of little interest to humans. There is some livestock grazing at lower elevations. Scientists have surveyed other frogs in the area for the fungal disease chytridiomycosis and did not detect it.

== Original description ==
- Grant T; Rada M; Anganoy-Criollo M; Batista A; Dias PH; Jeckel AM; Machado DJ; Rueda-Almonacid JV (2017). "Phylogenetic systematics of dart-poison frogs and their relatives revisited (Anura: Dendrobatoidea)". South American Journal of Herpetology (Abstract). 12 (S1): S1–S90. doi:10.2994/SAJH-D-17-00017.1.
