= Ectopoglossus isthminus =

Conservation status
- Endangered (IUCN 3.1)

Scientific classification
- Kingdom: Animalia
- Phylum: Chordata
- Class: Amphibia
- Order: Anura
- Family: Dendrobatidae
- Genus: Ectopoglossus
- Species: E. isthminus

Binomial name
- Ectopoglossus isthminus (Myers, Ibáñez, Grant & Jaramillo, 2012)
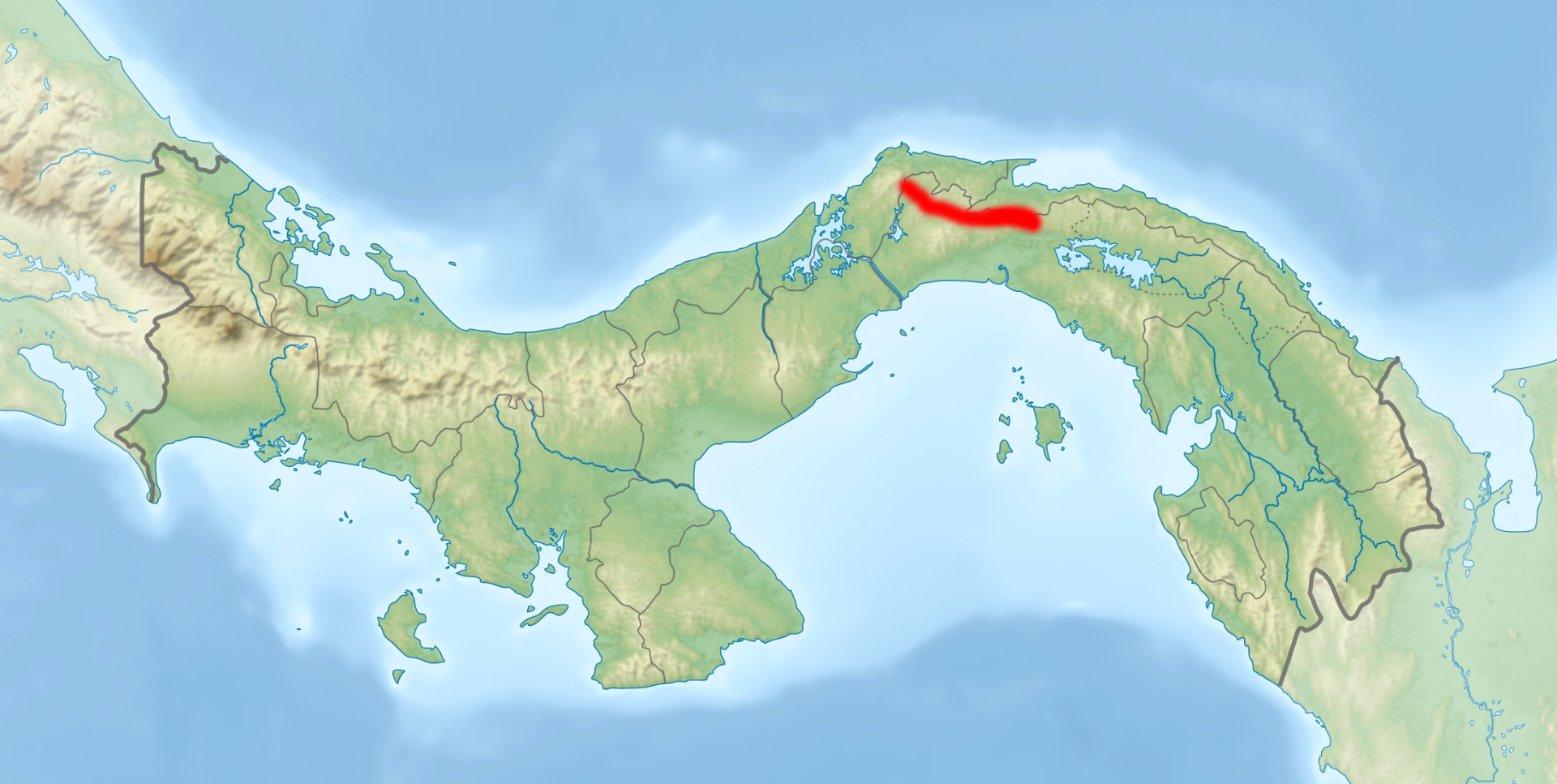
- Distribution of Ectopoglossus isthminus

Synonyms
- Anomaloglossus isthminus Myers, Ibáñez D., Grant, and Jaramillo, 2012

Species of frog

Ectopoglossus isthminus is a species of frog in the family Dendrobatidae. It is endemic to the Chagres Highlands of Panama, at 720 to 810 meters above sea level, where it can be mistaken for Colostethus panamansis, which is more common and also lives in the area. The frog's known range is almost exclusively within Chagres National Park.

== Description ==
Scientists examined several male adults, one female adult, and one juvenile female during the initial survey. The adult male frogs measured 19–21 mm in snout-vent length and the adult female frog 23 mm. The skin of the dorsum is mottled brown and darker brown. There are small, light yellow spots in the places where the four legs meet the body. The ventral areas are light blue in color with some dark color.

== Etymology ==
The scientists named the frog isthminus after the isthmus of Panama.

== Threats ==
The IUCN classifies this frog as endangered. Scientists believe the fungal disease chytridiomycosis may have caused population declines, but they have yet to detect the causative pathogen, Batrachochytrium dendrobatidis, on the species.
