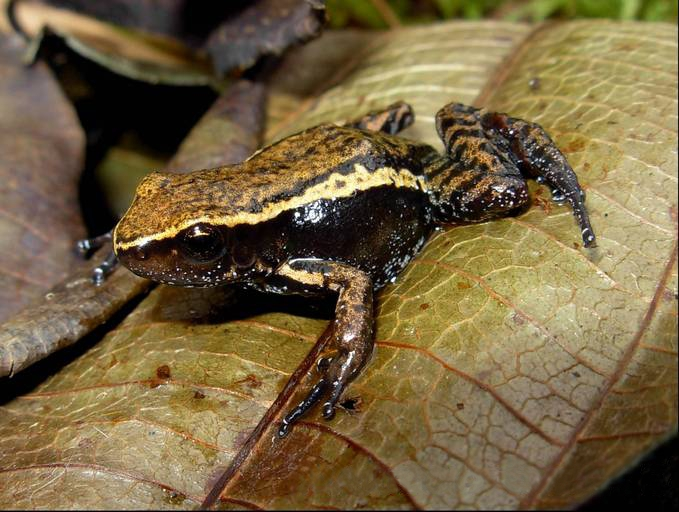
- Cream-backed poison frog (Hyloxalus subpunctatus)

Scientific classification
- Kingdom: Animalia
- Phylum: Chordata
- Class: Amphibia
- Order: Anura
- Family: Dendrobatidae
- Subfamily: Hyloxalinae; Grant, Frost, Caldwell, Gagliardo, Haddad, Kok, Means, Noonan, Schargel and Wheeler, 2006

Genera
- See text

= Hyloxalinae =

Subfamily of amphibians

Hyloxalinae is a subfamily of frogs in the family Dendrobatidae.

== Genera ==
It contains three genera:

- Ectopoglossus
- Hyloxalus
- Paruwrobates
