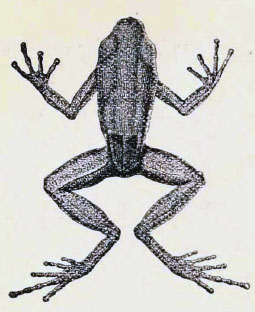
- Holotype of Paruwrobates whymperi from Boulenger's original species description

Scientific classification
- Kingdom: Animalia
- Phylum: Chordata
- Class: Amphibia
- Order: Anura
- Family: Dendrobatidae
- Subfamily: Hyloxalinae
- Genus: Paruwrobates; Bauer, 1994

Type species
- Dendrobates andinus Myers & Burrowes, 1987

= Paruwrobates =

Genus of amphibians

Paruwrobates is a genus of frogs in the family Dendrobatidae. The frogs are found in the Pacific slopes of the Andes in southern Colombia and northern Ecuador.

== Species ==
There are three species in Paruwrobates:

- Paruwrobates andinus
- Paruwrobates erythromos
- Paruwrobates whymperi
