= Ectopoglossus lacrimosus =

Conservation status
- Vulnerable (IUCN 3.1)

Scientific classification
- Kingdom: Animalia
- Phylum: Chordata
- Class: Amphibia
- Order: Anura
- Family: Dendrobatidae
- Genus: Ectopoglossus
- Species: E. lacrimosus

Binomial name
- Ectopoglossus lacrimosus (Myers, 1991)
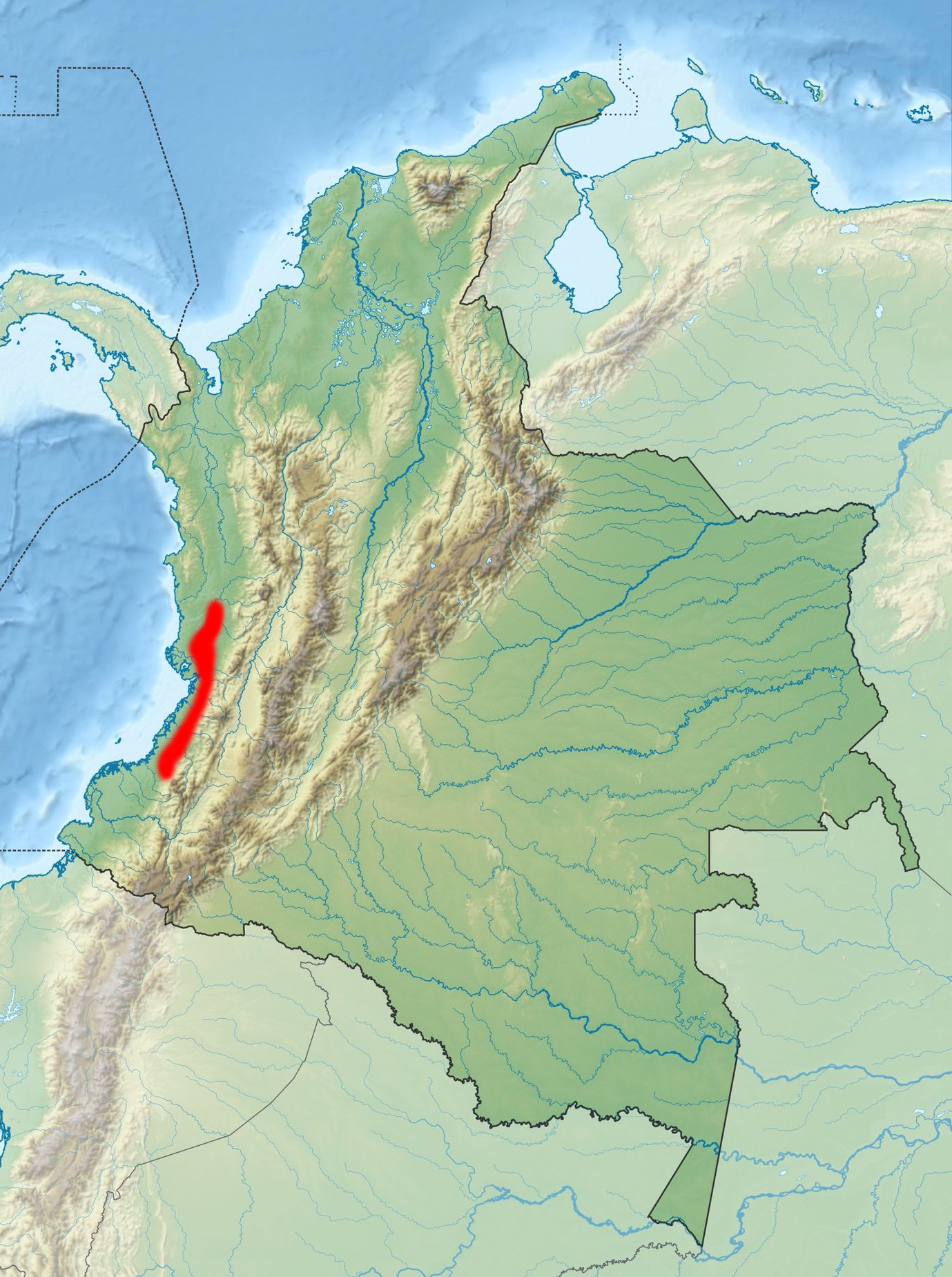
- Distribution of Ectopoglossus lacrimosus

Synonyms
- Colostethus lacrimosus Myers, 1991; Anomaloglossus lacrimosus (Myers, 1991)

Species of frog

Ectopoglossus lacrimosus is a species of frog in the family Dendrobatidae. It is endemic to western Colombia where it is known from the drainage of Atrato River, San Juan River, and Guanguí River. It is a very rare frog found along streams in lowland and foothill forests and may be declining from threats such as deforestation for agriculture (including illegal crops), logging, human settlement and pollution from spraying of illegal crops. The only conservation measure known is that it occurs in Parque Nacional Natural Farallones de Cali.

Ectopoglossus lacrimosus is greenish-brown in coloration, with white spots on the upper arms. The only known male specimen measured to be 15.8mm long. Females are generally larger than males, having a snout-cloaca length ranging from 17.7 to 19.6 mm.
