= Palenque poison frog =

Conservation status
- Critically Endangered (IUCN 3.1)
- CITES Appendix II

Scientific classification
- Kingdom: Animalia
- Phylum: Chordata
- Class: Amphibia
- Order: Anura
- Family: Dendrobatidae
- Genus: Paruwrobates
- Species: P. erythromos

Binomial name
- Paruwrobates erythromos (Vigle & Miyata, 1980)

Synonyms
- Epipedobates erythromos Myers, 1987; Ameerega erythromos (Vigle & Miyata, 1980)

Species of amphibian

The Palenque poison frog (Paruwrobates erythromos) is a species of frog in the family Dendrobatidae endemic to Ecuador. Its natural habitats are subtropical or tropical moist lowland forests and rivers. It is threatened by habitat loss.
