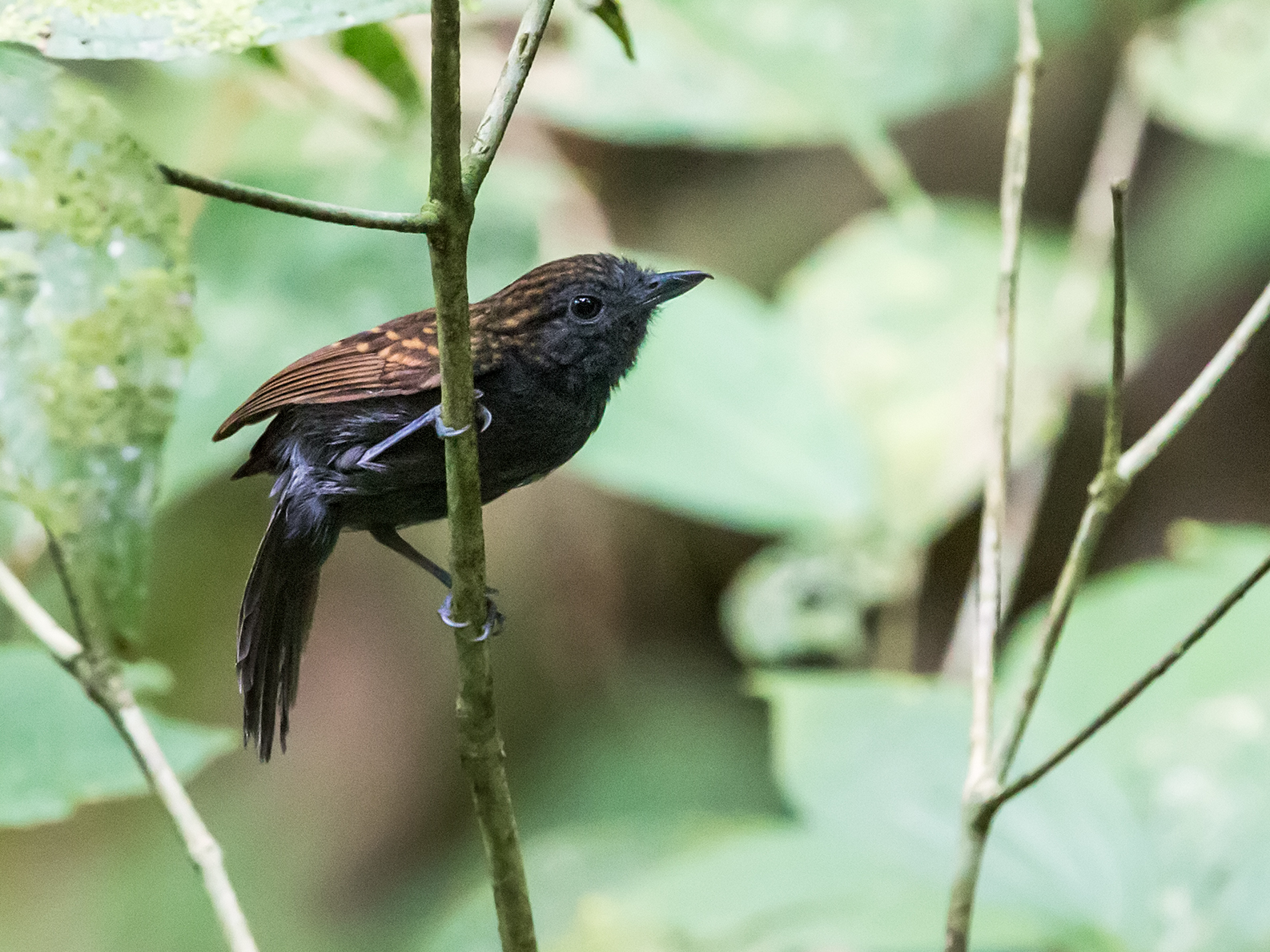

Conservation status
- Near Threatened (IUCN 3.1)

Scientific classification
- Kingdom: Animalia
- Phylum: Chordata
- Class: Aves
- Order: Passeriformes
- Family: Thamnophilidae
- Genus: Xenornis; Chapman, 1924
- Species: X. setifrons

Binomial name
- Xenornis setifrons Chapman, 1924

= Speckled antshrike =

Species of bird

The speckled antshrike or spiny-faced antshrike (Xenornis setifrons) is a Near Threatened species of bird in subfamily Thamnophilinae of family Thamnophilidae, the "typical antbirds". It is found in Colombia and Panama.

== Taxonomy and systematics ==
The speckled antshrike is the only member of genus Xenornis and has no subspecies. It appears to be most closely related to the four antshrikes of genus Thamnomanes.

== Description ==
The speckled antshrike is 13 to 16 cm (5.1 to 6.3 in) long; one female weighed 24.6 g (0.87 oz). The species exhibits some sexual dimorphism, though both sexes have a gray and black bill with a hook at the end like true shrikes. They also have short black bristles on their lores, below their eyes, at the base of the bill, and on their chin. Adult males have a dark gray forehead. Their crown, nape, back, and scapulars are olive brown to buffy brown; the scapulars have brown tips. The feathers of their upperparts have black edges and tips that appear as dark lines. Their rump and uppertail coverts are gray with an olive brown wash and their tail is blackish slate. Their wings are dusky brown with deep buff tips on the coverts, thin brown edges on the primaries, and brown tips on the inner secondaries. Their face, throat, and underparts are slate gray. Adult females have the same plumage on their upperparts as males. Their chin is dull white and their throat is whitish olive with small blackish brown spots. Their breast and sides are pale olive brown; the breast has indistinct blackish spots. Their flanks and vent area are darker olive brown than the breast. Both sexes have a pale gray iris, a black maxilla, a gray mandible, and dark gray legs and feet.

== Distribution and habitat ==
The speckled Antshrike is found on the Caribbean slope from the Canal Zone in Panama into far northwestern Colombia; there are also a few records from Colombia's Pacific slope. It occurs only locally and is considered rare in Colombia. It inhabits humid evergreen forest where it occurs almost entirely in dense understorey vegetation. It appears to favor the slopes and bottoms of ravines. In elevation it reaches 800 m (2,600 ft) in Panama but mostly occurs below 500 m (1,600 ft) there; it reaches 600 m (2,000 ft) in Colombia.

== Behavior ==
=== Movement ===
The speckled antshrike is presumed to be a year-round resident throughout its range.

=== Feeding ===
The speckled antshrike's diet is not known in detail but is primarily small arthropods. It mostly forages within about 2 m (7 ft) of the ground though as high as 5 m (15 ft). It moves through dense vegetation, typically capturing prey by short sideways or upward sallies from a perch. Pairs often accompany mixed-species feeding flocks.

=== Breeding ===
The only known nests of the speckled antshrike were cups made of rootlets and suspended by their rims in branch forks up to about 3 m (10 ft) above the ground and near streams. Both had two nestlings that both sexes provisioned. The usual clutch size, incubation period, time to fledging, and other details of parental care are not known.

=== Vocalization ===
The speckled antshrike's song is "a series of evenly spaced, high pitched notes, the series rising steadily in pitch". When singing voluntarily it typically makes five notes; when challenged by a recording it may sing between three and 12 notes. The species is not highly vocal, but both sexes sing, with the female's song being slower, shorter, and slightly lower pitched than the male's.

== Status ==
The IUCN originally in 1988 assessed the speckled antshrike as Threatened, in 1994 as Vulnerable, and since 2020 as Near Threatened. It has a limited range and its estimated population of 1500 to 7000 mature individuals is believed to be decreasing. "Due to its high forest dependence, the species is at risk of habitat loss through logging of forests for agricultural purposes...[m]ining, the completion of the Pan-American highway and the impact of rising human population resulting from such projects are potentially important future threats." It is generally considered rate but is fairly common locally.
