= Chagres National Park =

National park in Panama

- IUCN category II (national park)
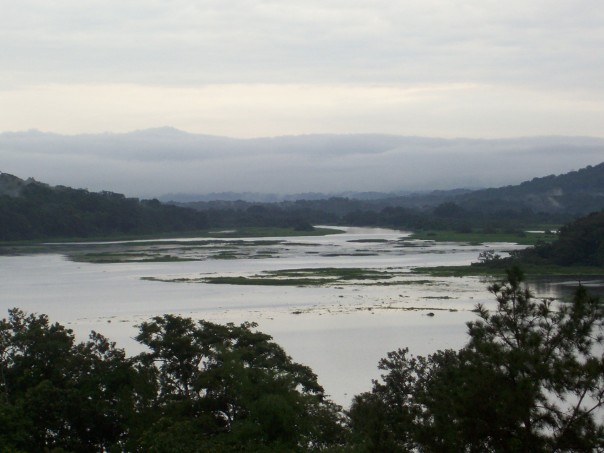

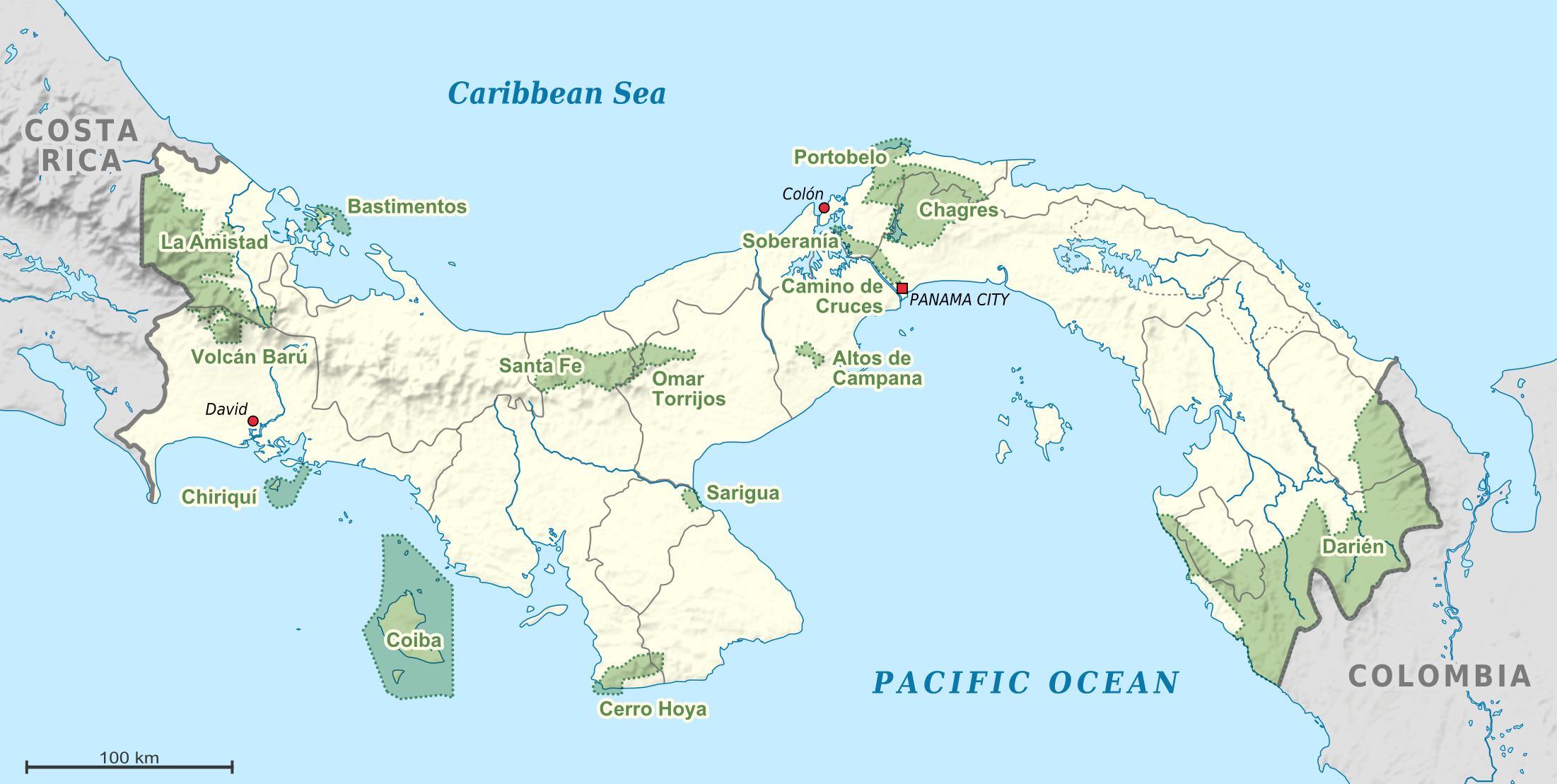
- Chagres National Park (top center) within Panama
- Location: Panamá Province, Panama
- Coordinates: 9.4°N 79.5°W
- Area: 129,000 hectares (320,000 acres)
- Established: 1985
- Website: Chagres National Park Foundation

Chagres National Park is a nature park and protected area created in 1986 located in the Panamá and Colón provinces, in the Eastern sector of the Panama Canal with a total surface area of 129,000 ha (320,000 acres).

The park extends across the Chagres Highlands, a group of low mountains drained by the headwaters of the Chagres River. The southern portion of the highlands is known as the Serranía Piedras-Pacora, and forms a portion of the Continental Divide of the Americas.

The park adjoins Portobelo National Park on the northwest, and Narganá Wilderness Area on the east.

== Environment ==
The park contains tropical rain forests and a set of rivers which provide sufficient water to guarantee the operation of the Gatun Lake, main lake of the Panama Canal: the Chagres River and the Gatun River. The highest point of the park is Cerro Jefe, at 1,007 m above sea level. It is considered a Key Biodiversity Area of international significance. It has been designated an Important Bird Area (IBA) by BirdLife International.

The frog Ectopoglossus isthminus is nearly endemic to the national park.

== Panama Canal Watershed ==
The park was created in 1985, with the aim of preserving the natural forest that composes it

- to produce water in amount and quality sufficient to guarantee the normal operation of the Panama Canal
- to supply potable water for the cities of Panama, Colon and la Chorrera,
- and the generation of electricity for the cities of Panama and Colon.
