= Tropical cyclones in 2022 =

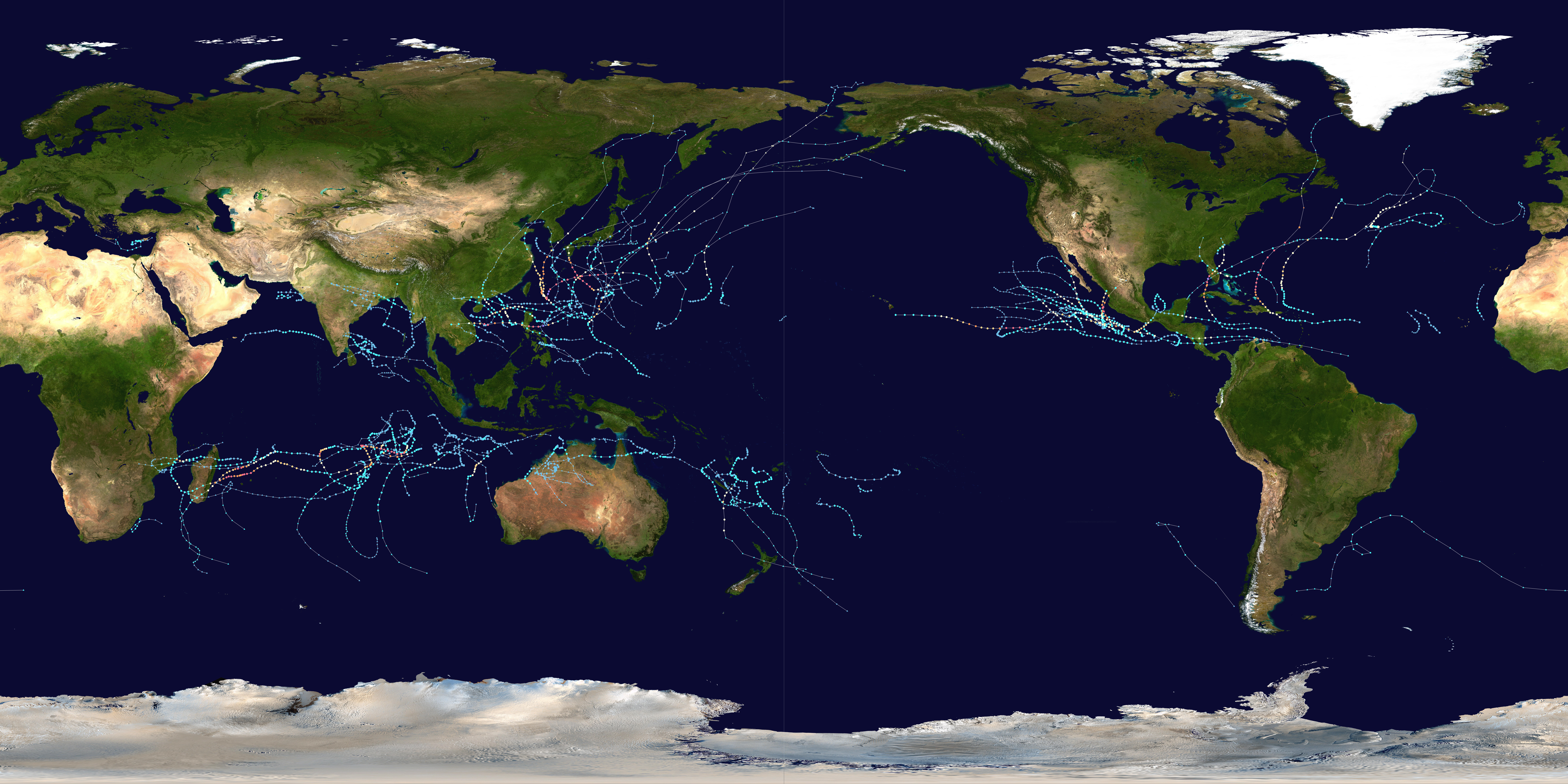
- Year summary map

Year boundaries
- First system: Cody
- Formed: January 5, 2022
- Last system: Ellie
- Dissipated: January 8, 2023

Strongest system
- Name: Nanmadol
- Lowest pressure: 910 mbar (hPa); 26.87 inHg

Longest lasting system
- Name: Ellie
- Duration: 19 days

Year statistics
- Total systems: 134
- Named systems: 88
- Total fatalities: 1,300 total
- Total damage: > $124.291 billion (2022 USD)
Related articles
- 2022 Atlantic hurricane season
- 2022 Pacific hurricane season
- 2022 Pacific typhoon season
- 2022 North Indian Ocean cyclone season
- 2021–22 South-West Indian Ocean cyclone season
- 2022–23 South-West Indian Ocean cyclone season
- 2021–22 Australian region cyclone season
- 2022–23 Australian region cyclone season
- 2021–22 South Pacific cyclone season
- 2022–23 South Pacific cyclone season

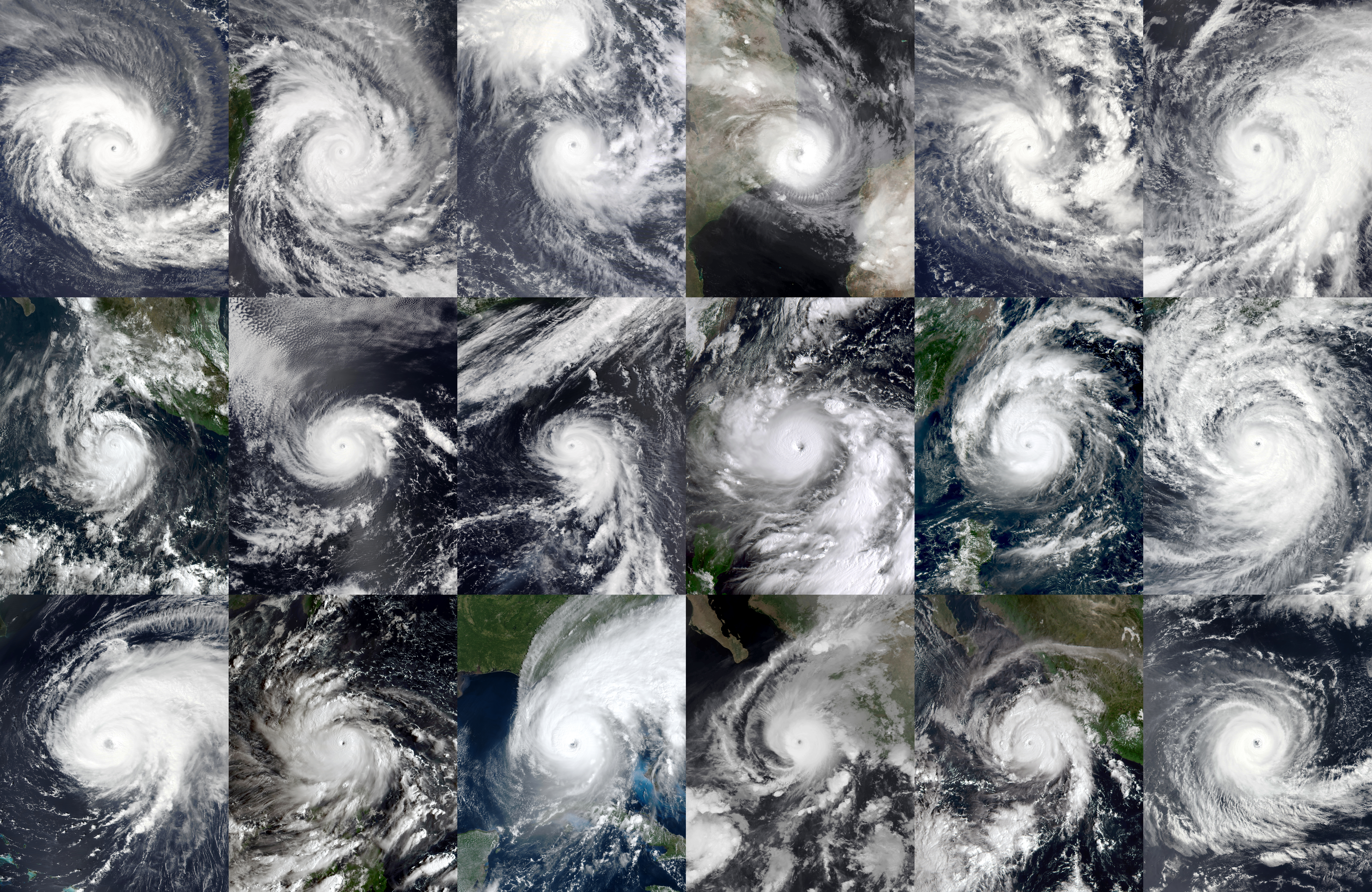
Satellites photos of the 18 tropical cyclones worldwide that reached at least Category 3 on the Saffir–Simpson scale throughout 2022, from Batsirai (upper left) in February to Darian (lower right) in December. Among them, Nanmadol (right most image in the second row) was the most intense with a minimum central pressure of 910 hPa.

During 2022, tropical cyclones formed in seven major bodies of water, commonly known as tropical cyclone basins. Tropical cyclones were named by various weather agencies when they attained maximum sustained winds of 35 knots (65 km/h; 40 mph). During the year, 134 systems formed, of which 88 were named. The strongest storm to form was Typhoon Nanmadol, with minimum pressure of 910 hPa (26.87 inHg). The deadliest tropical cyclone was Tropical Storm Megi, which caused 214 fatalities in the Philippines (excluding 132 others rendered missing), while the costliest was Hurricane Ian, which had an estimated damage total of at least $113.1 billion (2022 USD) after affecting Trinidad and Tobago, Venezuela, Colombia, the western part of the Greater Antilles and Southeast United States.

This year featured an average number of tropical cyclones globally. The most active basin of the year was the West Pacific, which had yet another below average season, with 25 named systems forming. The East Pacific was above average with 19 named storms forming, while the North Atlantic was average with 14 named storms, the fewest number since 2015. The North Indian basin produced 7 named storms, which constituted above average activity, however only one strengthened to cyclone strength. The Southern Hemisphere also featured average activity, with Cyclone Batsirai causing heavy damage and killing many people in Madagascar. Throughout the year, 18 major tropical cyclones formed, which included three Category 5 tropical cyclones, both figures being below the 1991–2020 global averages. The accumulated cyclone energy (ACE) index for 2022 (seven basins combined), as calculated by Colorado State University (CSU) was 559.6 units overall, which was the fewest number of units seen since 2010.

Tropical cyclones are primarily monitored by ten warning centers across the world, which are designated as a Regional Specialized Meteorological Center (RSMC) or a Tropical Cyclone Warning Center (TCWC) by the World Meteorological Organization (WMO). These ten centers are the National Hurricane Center (NHC) and the Central Pacific Hurricane Center (CPHC), Japan Meteorological Agency (JMA), Indian Meteorological Department (IMD), Météo-France (MFR), Indonesia's Meteorology, Climatology, and Geophysical Agency (BMKG), the Australian Bureau of Meteorology (BoM), Papua New Guinea's National Weather Service (PNGNWS), the Fiji Meteorological Service (FMS), and New Zealand's MetService. Unofficial, but still notable, warning centres include the Philippine Atmospheric, Geophysical and Astronomical Services Administration (PAGASA; albeit official within the Philippines), the United States's Joint Typhoon Warning Center (JTWC), and the Brazilian Navy Hydrographic Center.

== Global atmospheric and hydrological conditions ==
The La Niña that started in the fourth quarter of 2021 is expected to continue into at least the first quarter of 2022, with an 87% chance of it persisting between the period of December 2021 to February 2022. On March 10, NOAA released an update on the ENSO conditions in the Pacific, in the update the La Niña is favored to continue into the Northern Hemisphere's summer with a 53% chance of it persisting during June – August 2022 period, and with a 40 to 50% chance of La Niña or ENSO-neutral during the Northern Hemisphere's autumn.

== Summary ==
=== North Atlantic Ocean ===
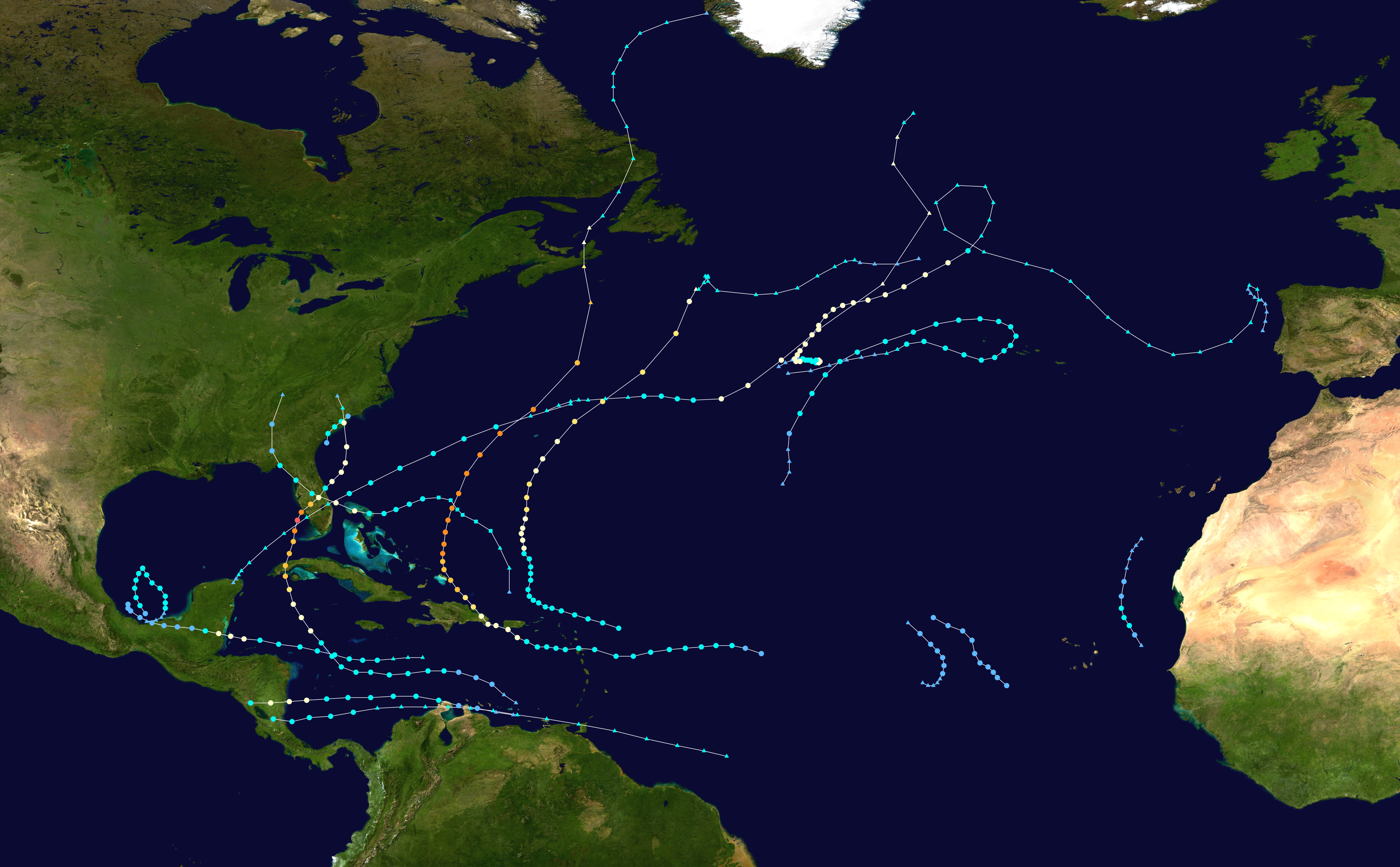
2022 Atlantic hurricane season summary map

The season started on May 31, when a low pressure area formed near the Yucatán Peninsula, partially related to the Pacific basin as the remnants of Agatha. Two days later, the NHC issued tropical storm watches for Cuba and parts of Florida and also designated the system as Potential Tropical Cyclone 01L. As it moved away from Florida, the system intensified into a tropical storm east of the state and was named Alex, becoming the first named storm in the Atlantic basin. The precursor of Alex killed 4 people in Cuba due to flooding. Alex also caused minor damages in Florida and Bermuda. On June 6, Alex transitioned into a post-tropical cyclone due to cooler waters and the loss of tropical characteristics. Alex's remnants later traveled across the North Atlantic towards Northern Europe, bringing heavy gale-force winds. Alex's formation on June 5 also made it the first season since 2014 to not have a pre-season named storm.

On June 23, a tropical wave that originated from the coast of Africa producing a large but disorganized area of showers and thunderstorms and the NHC classified the system as Invest 94L. Two day later, the disturbance moved along a west to west-northwesterly track toward the southernmost Windward Islands. On June 27, the NHC designated the system as Potential Tropical Cyclone 02L due to the threat the system posed to the Lesser Antilles and the northern area of Venezuela. As the disturbance moved towards off the coast of Central America on the morning of July 1, it became sufficiently organized to be classified as a tropical storm and was given the name Bonnie. Bonnie made landfall near the Costa Rica–Nicaragua border before it crossed into the Eastern Pacific basin, marking the first time a tropical cyclone survived the crossover from the Atlantic to the Pacific since Hurricane Otto in 2016.

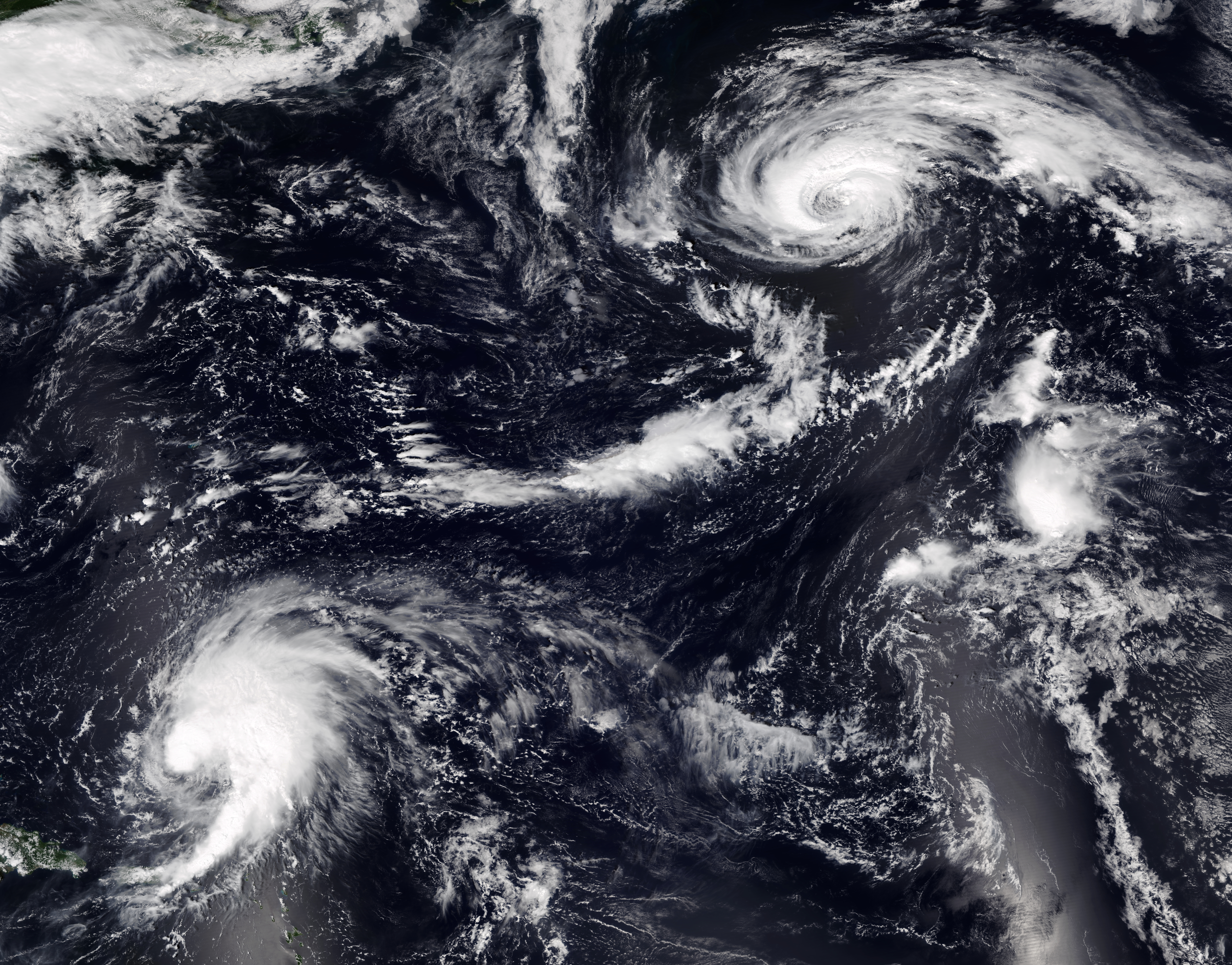
Tropical Storm Earl (bottom left) and Hurricane Danielle (top right) both active simultaneously on September 5, 2022.

On the same day, an area of low pressure formed offshore of Savannah, Georgia which made the NHC to classify the system as Invest 96L. On the next day, the system was designated as a tropical storm and given the name Colin as it approached North Carolina. Most of Colin's heavy rains and strong winds remained out over the Atlantic due to its proximity to the coast and northwesterly shear of around 25 mph (35 km/h). Colin then weakened into a tropical depression before it dissipated on July 3 over eastern North Carolina.

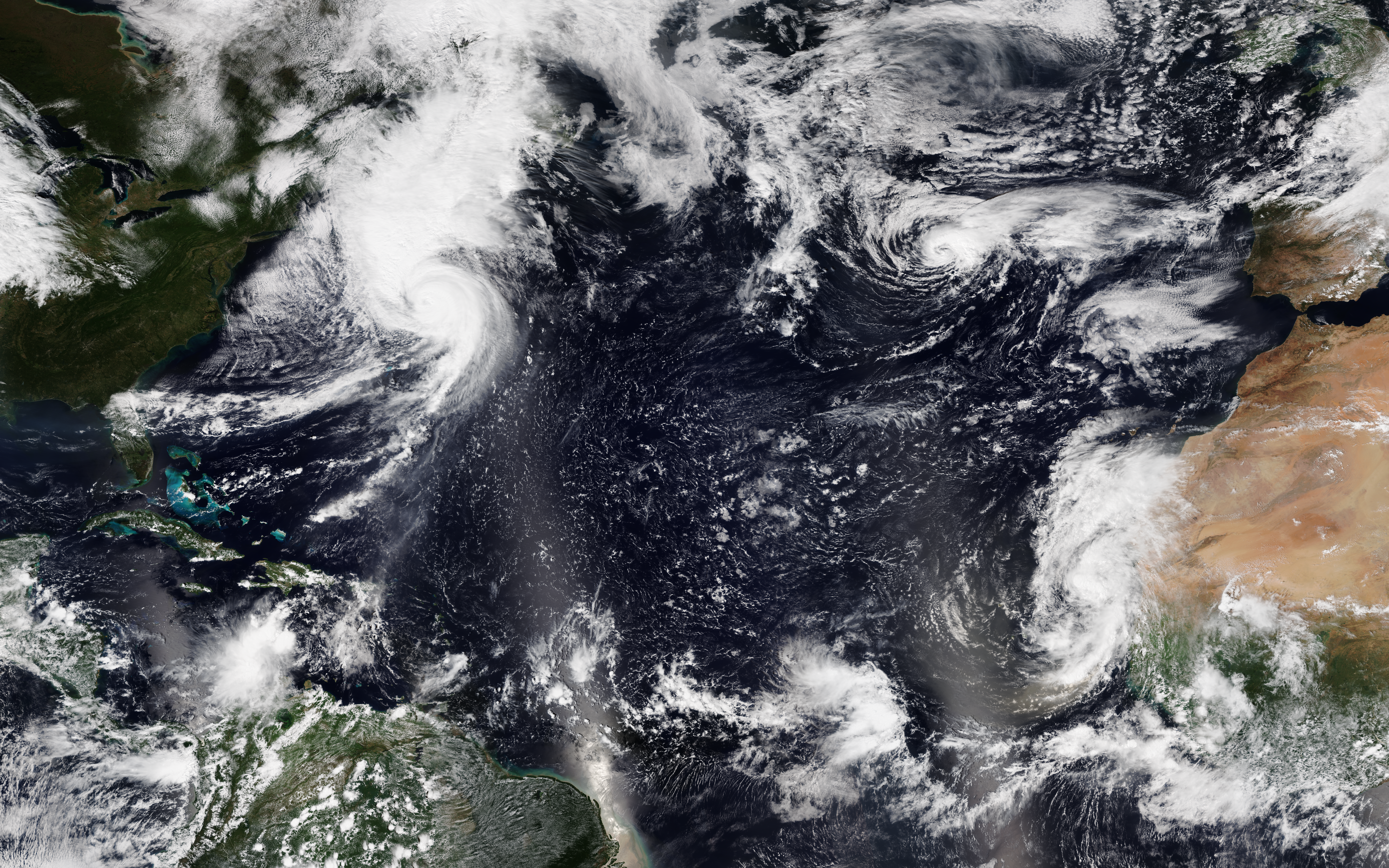
Four tropical cyclones active simultaneously on September 23, Fiona (left), Gaston (center top right), Hermine (bottom right), and a depression that would later become Ian (bottom left). The tropical wave that would later become Tropical Depression Eleven can be seen left of Hermine.

For the first time since 1997, no tropical cyclones formed in the basin during the month of August. This quiet period ended on September 1, when a tropical depression formed west of the Azores. The depression eventually organized into a tropical storm and was named Danielle by the NHC on the same day. Danielle later strengthened into the basin's first Atlantic hurricane of the season the following day. After Danielle's formation, another tropical depression formed east of the Leeward Islands on September 2. The depression organized into a tropical storm on the next day and was named Earl by the NHC. Earl further intensified into the basin's second hurricane. Earl reached its peak intensity as a Category 2 hurricane and became extratropical near the island of Newfoundland. Earl killed two people in Puerto Rico and caused minor flooding along the Canadian coast. Danielle on the other hand, stayed over the North Atlantic and did not affect any landmass. On September 12, the NHC began monitoring a tropical low in the central Atlantic for potential development. Two days later, the low became better organized and was designated as Tropical Depression Seven by the NHC. The depression further organized and was named Fiona. Fiona further intensified into the basin's third hurricane by September 18 and made landfall on Puerto Rico and the Dominican Republic. Fiona then headed north and later reached its peak intensity as a Category 4 hurricane, becoming the first major hurricane of the season. Fiona then became a post-tropical cyclone and later made landfall on Nova Scotia. Altogether, at least 19 deaths have been attributed to Fiona. In Puerto Rico, which was still recovering from the effects of Hurricane Maria in 2017. 16 deaths were reported. In Guadeloupe, Dominican Republic and Canada, one death in each country was also reported. Fiona was also notable for having the lowest central pressure of 932 mbars at such a northerly latitude since 1979. On September 16, the NHC began to monitor a tropical wave over the central tropical Atlantic for potential development. The low gradually organized over the next few days and was later designated as Tropical Depression Eight on September 20. It further intensified into a tropical storm and was later named Gaston on the same day. Additionally, the NHC began tracking another tropical wave which was located east of the Windward Islands. By September 23, the low was able to form a well-defined circulation which resulted the NHC to classify the system as Tropical Depression Nine. The depression was then named Ian on the next day. On September 27, Ian began rapidly intensifying and made landfall on western Cuba as a Category 3 hurricane. Ian then emerged off the coast of Cuba and entered the Gulf of Mexico before strengthening further into a Category 5 hurricane. Ian then made landfall on Florida as a high-end Category 4 hurricane, tying as the 5th-strongest hurricane on record to make landfall in the contiguous United States. After making its second landfall in Southwest Florida, Ian rapidly weakened into a tropical storm before moving back out into Atlantic, where the storm reintensified back into a hurricane and made landfall in South Carolina. Ian caused catastrophic damage across Southwest Florida, mostly from flooding due to extreme storm surge and rainfall. The hurricane killed at least 140 people across the Southeast United States mostly in Florida and The Carolinas and Cuba. On September 22, the NHC began tracking a tropical wave off the coast of Africa. The low quickly organized and was named Hermine by the NHC. Hermine was rather short-lived and dissipated on September 25 due to wind shear. Despite its short duration, Hermine was known for reaching tropical storm strength as it was located between the Cabo Verde Islands and the coast of Africa. On September 21, the NHC began to monitor a tropical wave located west-southwest of the Cabo Verde Islands for possible development. The depression was classified as Tropical Depression Eleven after showing some signs of organization on September 28. However, the depression remained poorly organized and dissipated in the open Atlantic on the next day. Nearing the end of September, the NHC began to monitor another tropical wave which emerged off the west coast of Africa for potential development. It was then classified as Tropical Depression Twelve after its structure became slightly organized on October 4. However, the depression was also short lived and dissipated three days later due to the influence of strong wind shear.

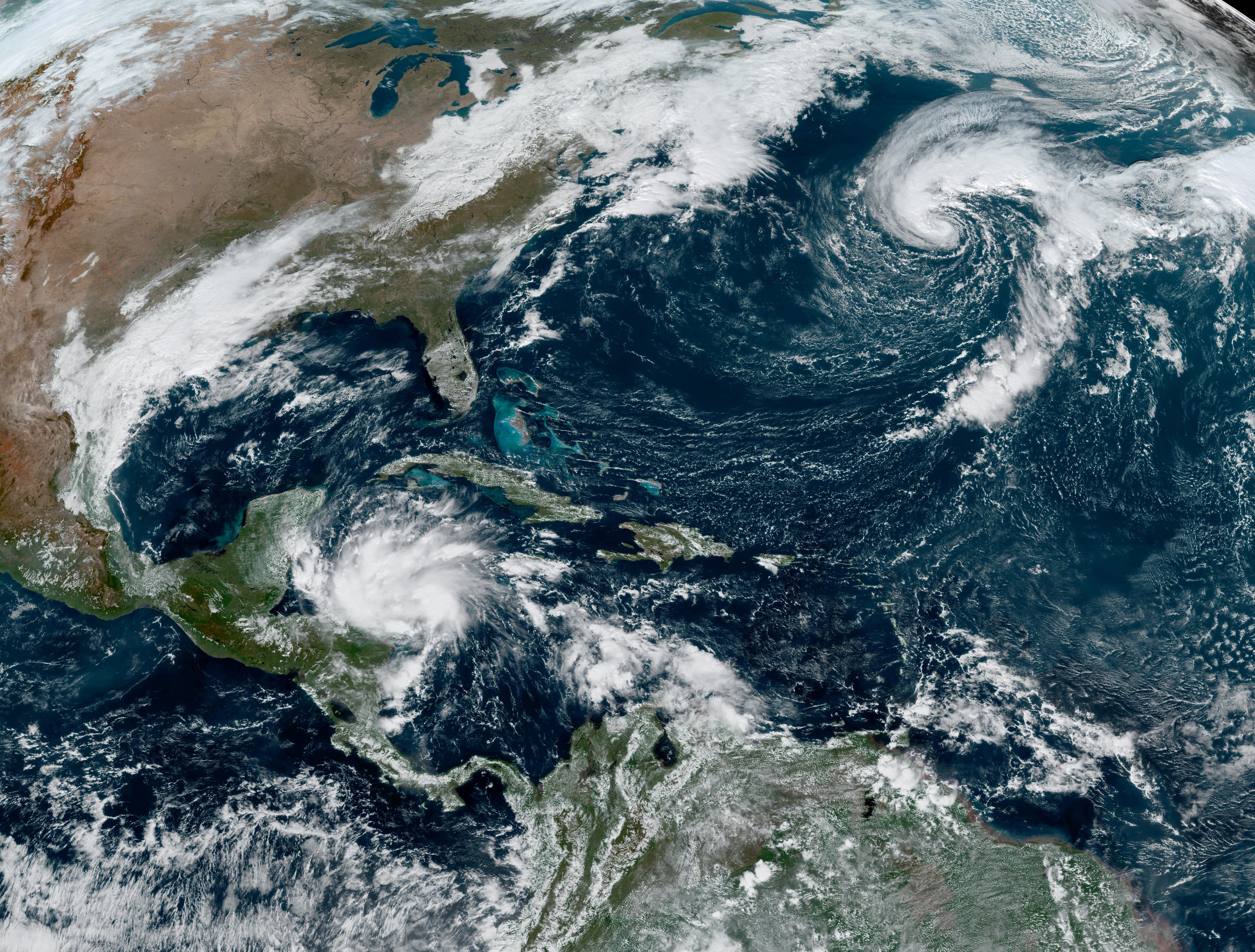
Tropical Storm Lisa (bottom left) and Hurricane Martin (top right) both active simultaneously on November 1, 2022.

On October 2, the NHC began monitoring a tropical wave located in the central Atlantic. As the wave began to approach the southern Windward Islands, the NHC initiated advisories on it as Potential Tropical Cyclone Thirteen on October 6. As the depression moved across the Guajira Peninsula on the next day, the system intensified into a tropical storm was named Julia. Julia then intensified further into a hurricane on October 8, and reached its peak intensity as a Category 1 hurricane with a minimum central pressure of 982 mbars. It then made landfall over Nicaragua, at the same intensity. Julia then left the Atlantic basin and entered the Eastern Pacific as a tropical storm before becoming a remnant low offshore of Guatemala on October 10. Julia was a rather deadly hurricane as it killed at least 91 people, mostly in Venezuela and Central America. Additionally, Julia was the second storm of the season to survive the crossover between the Atlantic–Pacific basin, after Bonnie in July. On October 10, the NHC began to monitor an area of disturbed weather located north of dissipating Tropical Storm Julia. The low later moved over the Bay of Campeche, where the system rapidly organized into Tropical Storm Karl on the next day. Karl's lifespan was rather short-lived as the system stalled in the Gulf of Mexico before rapidly weakening back into a tropical depression and dissipating on October 15 over Southern Mexico. Karl caused moderate flooding in Mexico, which damaged multiple infrastructures in the region. The storm also killed at least three people. On October 28, the NHC began monitoring a low pressure area developed over the southeastern Caribbean. Three days later, the depression strengthened into a tropical storm, which was then named Lisa. Lisa further strengthened into a hurricane on November 2, before it made landfall over Belize. Lisa then rapidly weakened inland before emerging into the Bay of Campeche. Lisa's remnants dissipated on November 5 without intensifying further. Lisa caused moderate damage along its path, although no fatalities were reported from the hurricane.

On the last day of October, the NHC began monitoring a low pressure located in the Atlantic for possible development. On November 1, deep convection developed near the center of the system, which resulted in the formation of Martin. Martin later strengthened into a hurricane while heading northeast. It then transitioned into a post-tropical cyclone while maintaining its strength on November 3, over the North Atlantic. Martin then approached Ireland as a European windstorm before dissipating. On November 4, the NHC began to monitor an area in the northeastern Caribbean Sea where a large non-tropical low pressure system was expected to develop within a few days. On the next day, a low pressure area formed north of Puerto Rico, which was producing disorganized showers and thunderstorms. On November 7, the disturbance was classified as subtropical storm and was named Nicole. Nicole's structure further improved and was classified as a tropical storm on the next day. It then passed the Bahamas before strengthening into a hurricane and later making landfall over Florida while maintaining its strength. Nicole then headed north towards Georgia before dissipating over West Virginia. Despite Nicole being relatively weak, its large size caused heavy damage across its path including parts of Florida which was already devastated by Hurricane Ian six weeks earlier. 11 deaths were also reported from the hurricane.

=== Eastern and Central Pacific Ocean ===
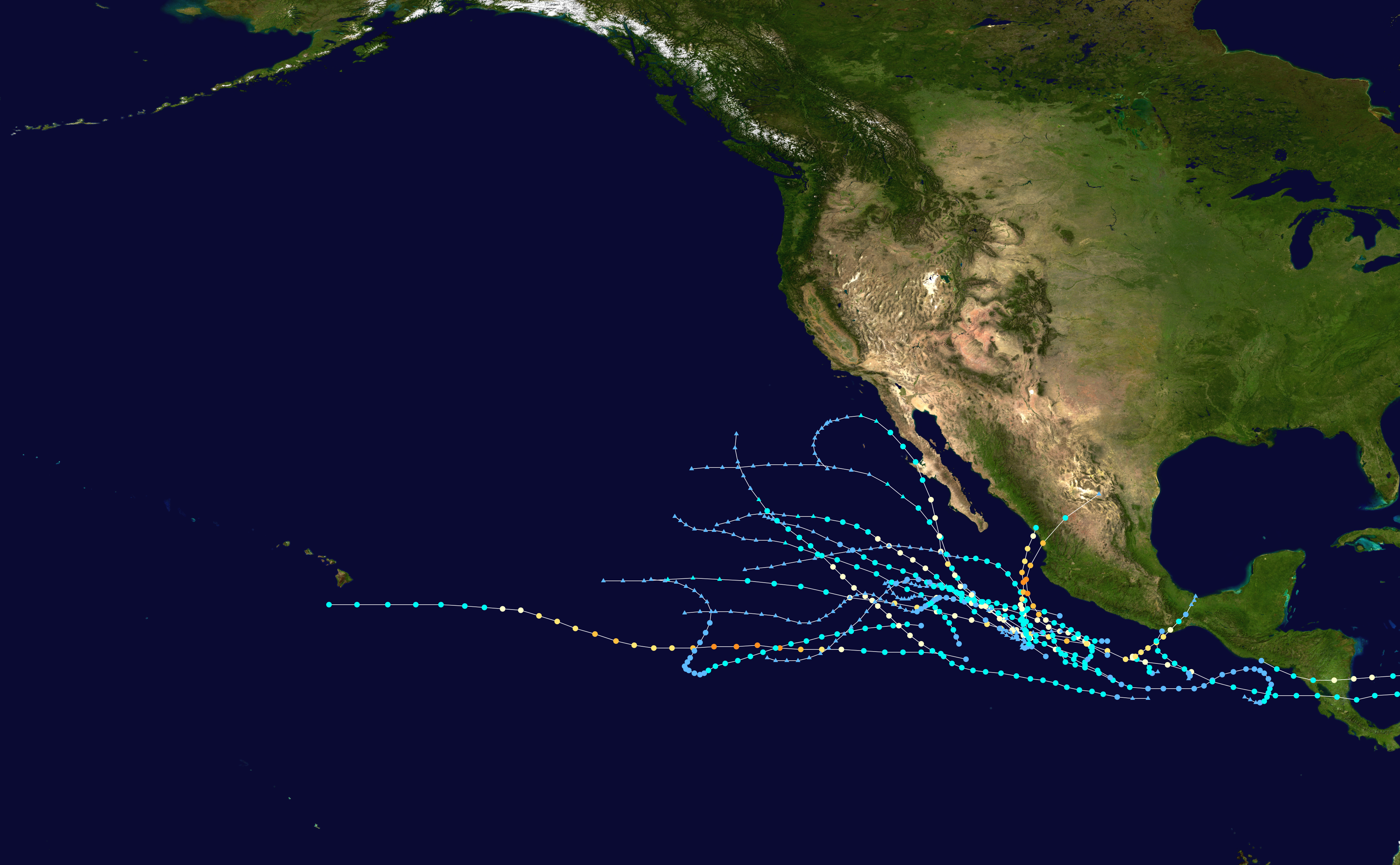
2022 Pacific hurricane season summary map

On May 22, The NHC monitored a low-pressure area located several miles off the coast of Mexico for potential development. On May 28, the system eventually developed into a tropical depression which became the first storm in the basin and was designated as One-E by the NHC. Later, the system strengthened into a tropical storm and was named Agatha. Agatha furthermore intensified into the basin's first hurricane. Agatha reached its peak intensity as a Category 2 hurricane and made landfall near Puerto Angel in Mexico with winds up to 105 mph. This made Agatha the strongest hurricane to make landfall during the month of May in the basin.

Earth on June 21 featuring Tropical Storm Celia (center left) and a degenerating Blas (left) south of the Baja California peninsula and a low pressure area which later became Bonnie (far right) off the coast of Africa.

On the first week of June, the NHC first noted a low pressure area that formed off the Gulf of Tehuantepec, and designated the system as Invest 92E. On June 11, the disturbance became more organized and the system was reclassified as Tropical Depression Two-E three days later by the NHC. Later, the depression intensified to a tropical storm and was named Blas which became the second named storm in the Eastern Pacific basin. Blas further intensified into the basin's second hurricane. Blas's structure continued to improve, developing a mid-level eye on the western portions of the cyclone. On June 18, Blas weakened into a tropical storm due to unfavorable conditions causing Blas's structure to deteriorate along with its deep convection. Two days later, Blas transitioned into a post-tropical cyclone and dissipated on June 24. Blas caused four deaths, two in Guerrero and two in Puebla in Mexico. Additionally, six people died in El Salvador due to heavy rain related to Blas's precursor disturbance and other weather systems. No coastal watches or warnings were put into effect for Blas. As a precaution, ports in Southern Mexico, an area still recovering from the impacts of Hurricane Agatha 19 days prior closed on June 16. On June 11, another low pressure area formed off the coast of Central America which prompted the NHC to designated the system as Invest 93E. Two days later, a trough of low pressure formed a couple of hundred miles southwest of the coast of Nicaragua. On June 16, the system intensified into a tropical depression which was then classified as Three-E by the NHC, while heading north. Later, the system received the name Celia after it became a tropical storm. A day later, Celia weakened back into a tropical depression due to its easterly winds, which resulted in moderate wind shear as it moved west-southwestward over the following few days due to the steering flow of a mid-level ridge to its north. On June 21, Celia re-strengthened into a tropical storm. After paralleling the Mexican coast, Celia once again weakened back into a tropical depression where it lost most of its significant convection.

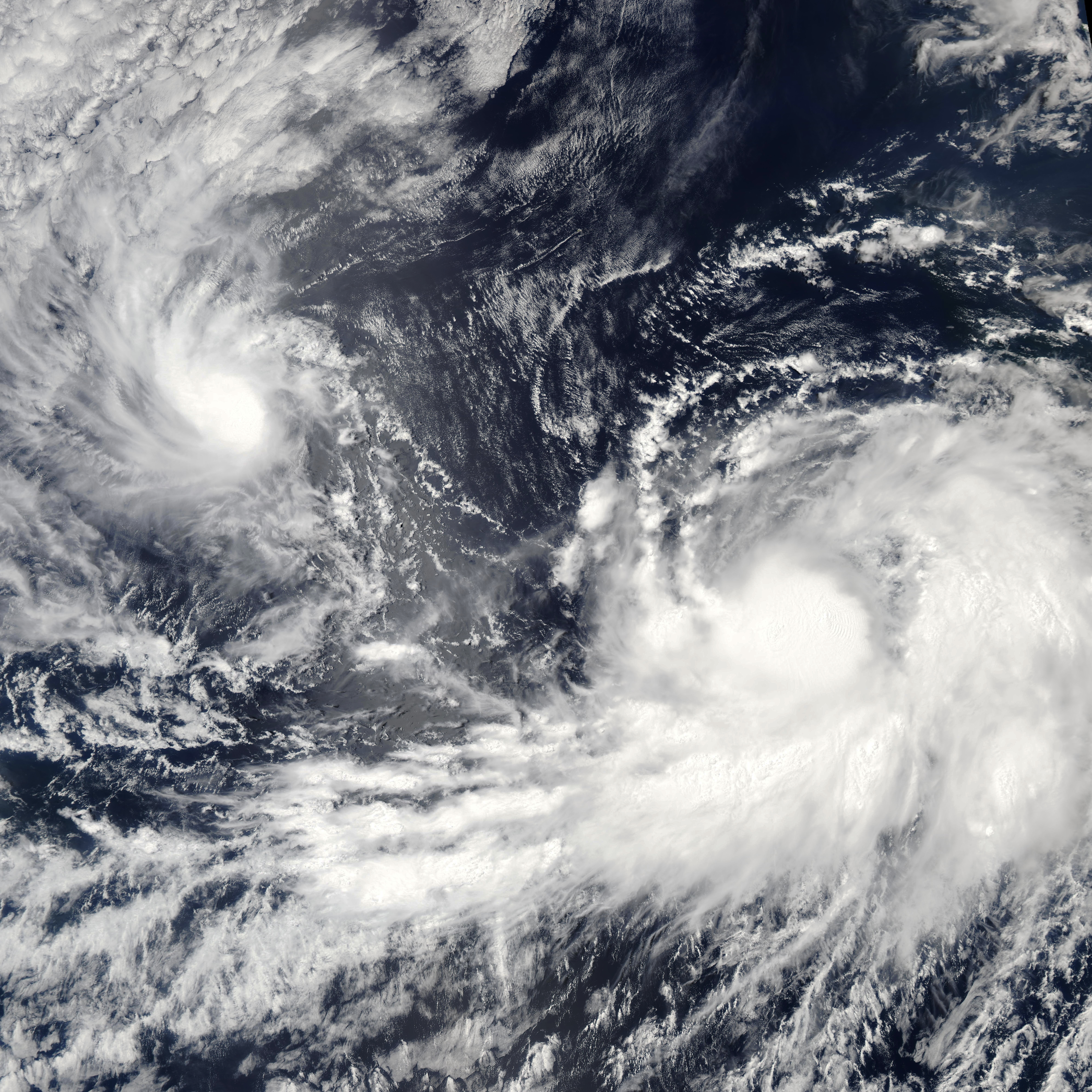
Tropical Storm Frank (right) and Tropical Storm Georgette (left) both active consecutively on July 28, 2022.

On July 2, Bonnie entered the Pacific basin from the Atlantic basin as a tropical storm. Bonnie became the first tropical cyclone to survive the crossover from the Atlantic to the Pacific since Hurricane Otto in 2016. Bonnie later strengthened into the basin's third hurricane and later became the first major hurricane in the basin. Bonnie reached its peak intensity as a Category 3 hurricane as it paralleled the coast of Mexico. It then weakened into a post-tropical storm on July 9 near the Central Pacific basin. On July 5, another low pressure area formed south of the Central American coast where the NHC classified the system as Invest 95E. The low became better organized on July 9, along with a burgeoning central dense overcast forming near the center. Later that day, it further concluded that the disturbance had likely developed a closed circulation, and was designated as 05E. Soon, the system intensified into a Tropical Storm and was named Darby. Two days later, Darby intensified into the basin's fourth hurricane and furthermore into the second major hurricane in the basin. Darby reached its peak intensity as a Category 4 hurricane while acquiring annular hurricane characteristics at the same time. Darby then entered the Central Pacific basin on July 14 and passed south of the Big Island of Hawaii before dissipating on July 17. On July 7, the NHC began monitoring a low pressure area south of the coast of Central America for potential development. The NHC classified the low as Invest 96E. Eight days later, the disturbance became better organized and was classified as Tropical Depression 06-E by the NHC. On July 16, the system strengthened into a tropical storm where it was named Estelle. A day later, Estelle strengthened into the basin's fifth hurricane. However, due to unfavorable conditions and severe wind shear, Estelle failed to strengthened any further and reached its peak intensity as a Category 1 hurricane. On July 19, Estelle was downgraded into a tropical storm where its center was located north of Clarion Island. Two days later, Estelle dissipated as it moved away from the Mexican coast. On July 21, a low pressure area developed off the southern coasts of El Salvador and Guatemala, and the NHC classified the low as Invest 97E. Five days later, after deep convection developed at the center of the disturbance and become better organized, it was designated as a Tropical Depression 07-E by the NHC. Later, the system gradually became better organized and was named Frank by the NHC. The storm later intensified into the basin's sixth hurricane four days later. Frank failed to strengthen further (as a major hurricane) due to wind shear and cooler waters, which caused the system to weaken. Instead, Frank reached its peak intensity as a Category 1 hurricane. Slowly continued to decreasing sea temperatures and Frank began to weaken until it was downgraded as a tropical storm on August 1. Frank continues to weakening further as a post-tropical cyclone a day later, before it dissipated on August 5. Followed by Invest 97E, the NHC began monitoring another low pressure area which was located southwest of the coast of southwestern Mexico for possible tropical development on July 25. The NHC classified the low as Invest 98E. On July 27, the system intensified into a tropical depression and was designated as Tropical Depression 08-E by the NHC. Later, the depression strengthened into a compact tropical storm, which received the name Georgette. Georgette stayed as a tropical storm during its lifespan and failed to strengthen any further due to heavy wind shear generated by the outflow from the circulation of nearby Hurricane Frank. On August 2, Georgette degenerated into a remnant low over the open ocean, until it disspated on August 6.

On August 2, the NHC began monitoring a tropical wave producing widespread showers and thunderstorms over Central America and the adjacent waters in anticipation that an area of low pressure would form once it moved over the eastern Pacific. The NHC classified the low as Invest 99E. Four days later, the disturbance had become sufficiently organized to be classified as a tropical depression, which was designated as Tropical Depression 09-E by the NHC. On August 7, the depression strengthened into a Tropical Storm which was assigned the name Howard. Howard reached its peak intensity as a Category 1 hurricane before its convection started to collapse. Howard degenerated into a post-tropical low on August 11. On August 7, the NHC began forecasting an area of low pressure off the southwestern coast of Mexico. The low eventually became better organized to be classified as a tropical depression. Despite being over warm waters, the depression struggled to intensify due to moderate wind shear. Later, an unexpected burst of convection resulted the depression briefly strengthening into a tropical storm which was then named Ivette by the NHC. Ivette's structure once again collapsed which resulted the system weakening back into a tropical depression. Ivette later degenerated into a remnant low on August 16.

Earth on September 22 featuring Newton (center left) and Madeline weakening west of Newton in the Pacific basin. Additionally with Hurricane Fiona and Gaston (top right) in the Atlantic basin.

On the first of September, a tropical depression formed off the southern tip of the Baja California peninsula. The system later strengthened into a tropical storm on the next day and was named Javier by the NHC. Javier's lifespan was rather short and dissipated on September 4 as it entered cooler waters. On the same day, another tropical depression organized off the coast of Mexico. The system was later named Kay by the NHC as it reached tropical storm status. Kay later strengthened into a hurricane on September 5. Kay reached its peak intensity a Category 2 hurricane as it was located off the Baja California peninsula. Kay later weakened back into a Category 1 hurricane and made landfall along the Baja California peninsula on September 8. The storm further weakened into a tropical storm and degenerated into a post-tropical cyclone southwest of San Diego. Kay killed three people along Mexico and caused minor damages along the Baja California peninsula. Additionally, Kay's outer bands struck Southern California which brought heavy winds and record rainfall mostly in San Diego County. On September 11, a disorganized low pressure area formed off the southern coast of Mexico. Four days later, the NHC classified the low as Tropical Depression Thirteen-E after it became better defined with a curved band of convection forming. On September 16, it was then named Lester. Lester however weakened back into a tropical depression and made landfall along the coast of southwestern Mexico on the afternoon of September 17, and rapidly dissipated. Earlier that same day, Madeline formed off the coast of Mexico. Madeline first approached the Mexican coast before curving away from the mainland without making landfall. Madeline weakened into a remnant low on September 20. On the next day, Newton also formed off the coast of Mexico. Newton headed east of Mexico and weakened three days later without affecting and landmass. However, the NHC continued monitoring Newton's remnants for possible regeneration as it was located in the open Pacific. The low slightly organized before its structure deteriorated further and dissipated completely on September 28. Nearing the end of September on the 29th, the NHC began to monitor another depression off the coast of Mexico for potential development. The depression developed a well-defined center late that day, becoming a tropical depression. It further developed into a tropical storm, which was then named Orlene on the next day. Orlene then continued to intensify further into a hurricane and reached its peak intensity as a Category 4 hurricane on October 2. As the hurricane approached Mexico, Orlene encountered severe wind shear which resulted in the hurricane to rapidly weaken. Orlene then made landfall in Escuinapa Municipality, Sinaloa, as a Category 1 hurricane before rapidly weakening overland on October 4. Despite Orlene causing widespread flooding and several mudslides to the area, no casualties were reported.

On October 3, Paine formed southwest of the southern tip of the Baja California peninsula. Paine was rather short lived and dissipated two days later without affecting any landmass. On October 9, Hurricane Julia from the Atlantic basin entered the Eastern Pacific basin as a tropical storm after making landfall over Nicaragua. Julia however stayed overland and never emerged into the Pacific Ocean before it degenerated into a remnant low offshore of Guatemala. On October 16, the NHC began monitoring the southern coast of Mexico where a low-pressure area was expected to form within a few weeks. The low eventually formed producing a large area of showers and thunderstorms. Four days later, the system organized into a tropical depression, which was then classified as Nineteen-E by the NHC. On the same day, the depression reached tropical storm status which was later named Roslyn. Roslyn then reached hurricane status on the next day. As the hurricane began turning towards the Mexican coast, Roslyn reached its peak as a strong Category 4 hurricane with winds up to 130 mph (215 km/h). Roslyn then made landfall as a Category 3 hurricane before rapidly weakening overland. Roslyn killed at least 4 people and caused moderate damage.

=== Western Pacific Ocean ===
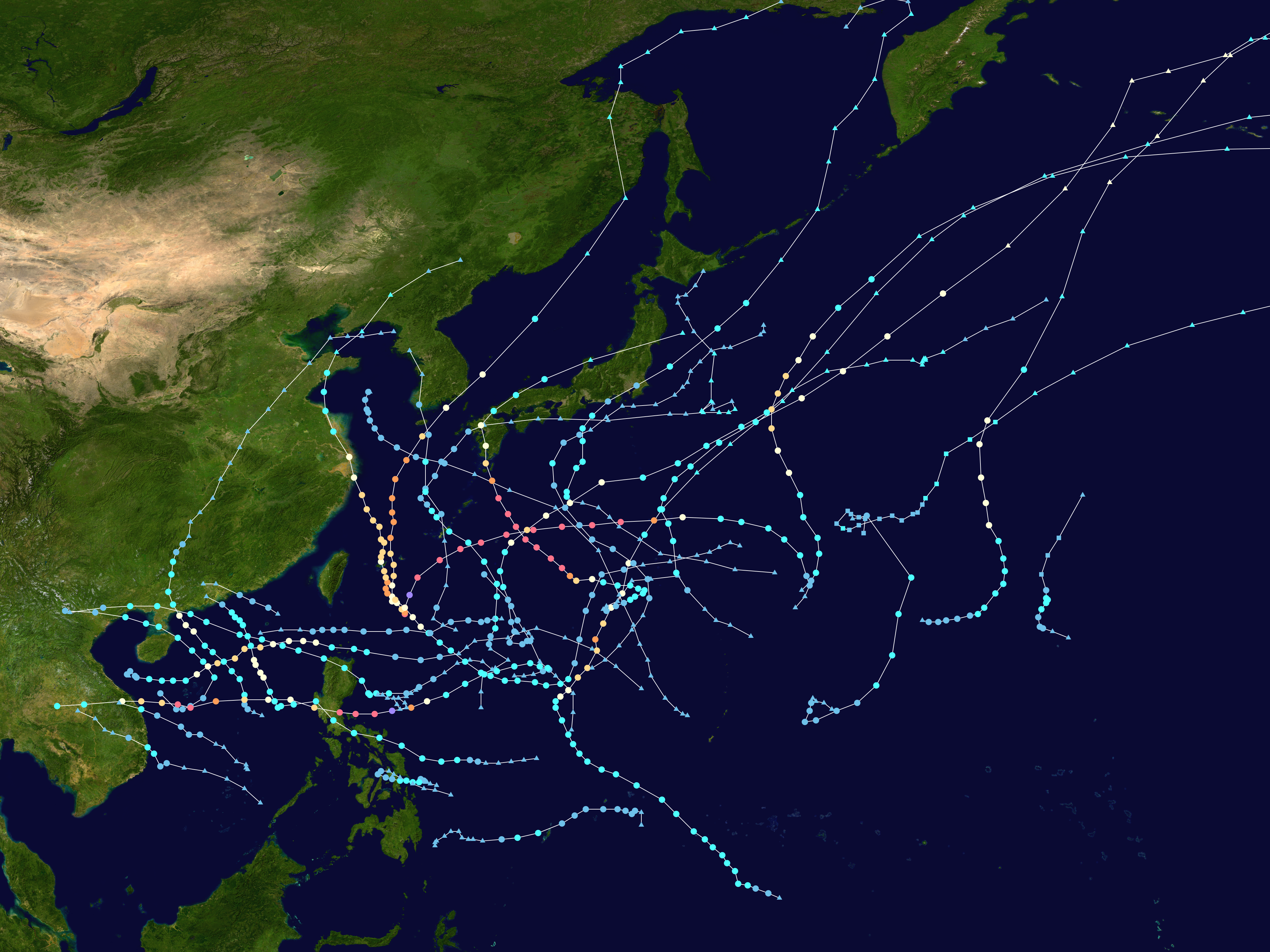
2022 Pacific typhoon season summary map

The Western Pacific Ocean typhoon season began on March 29, with the formation of a tropical depression southeast of Da Nang, Vietnam. The JTWC designated the system as 01W the next day. The system later struck mainland Vietnam and dissipated shortly afterwards. 01W killed at least 6 people and caused minor flooding in the country.

Animation of two tropical cyclones present in the Western Pacific Ocean between April 9 to 10: Megi (left) affecting the Philippines and Malakas (right) intensifying east of Yap.

On April 6, a tropical depression formed near the Caroline Islands and slowly intensified into Tropical Depression 02W. Two days later, another tropical depression formed northwest of Palau which was then named Agaton by the PAGASA. On April 10, the system briefly intensified into a tropical storm and was named Megi by the JMA. 02W on the other hand, also strengthened into a tropical storm on April 8 and was named Malakas by the JMA, becoming the first named storm in the basin. Moreover, Malakas entered the Philippine Area of Responsibility and was given the name Basyang from the PAGASA. As Malakas intensified into a severe tropical storm and later into the basin's first typhoon, Megi made its first landfall on Calicoan Island. Megi then stalled over Leyte Gulf allowing it to drop tremendous amounts of rainfall over the Visayas region. It then made its second landfall on Basey and Samar while it was slowly moving. Megi also affected much of the location where Typhoon Rai struck the same region four months prior, worsening its condition even further. As of April 29, Megi killed at least 214 and left 132 people missing in the Philippines mostly from numerous landslides and severe flooding. This made Megi the deadliest tropical cyclone ever recorded in the month of April in the Philippines. Megi then got assimilated into the outflow of the much larger Malakas, which then intensified to a Category-4 equivalent typhoon shy of super typhoon strength. Malakas then headed northeast towards Japan and struck the Bonin Islands before passing east of the country. It then transitioned into an extratropical cyclone by April 15. Its remnants later affected parts of Alaska.

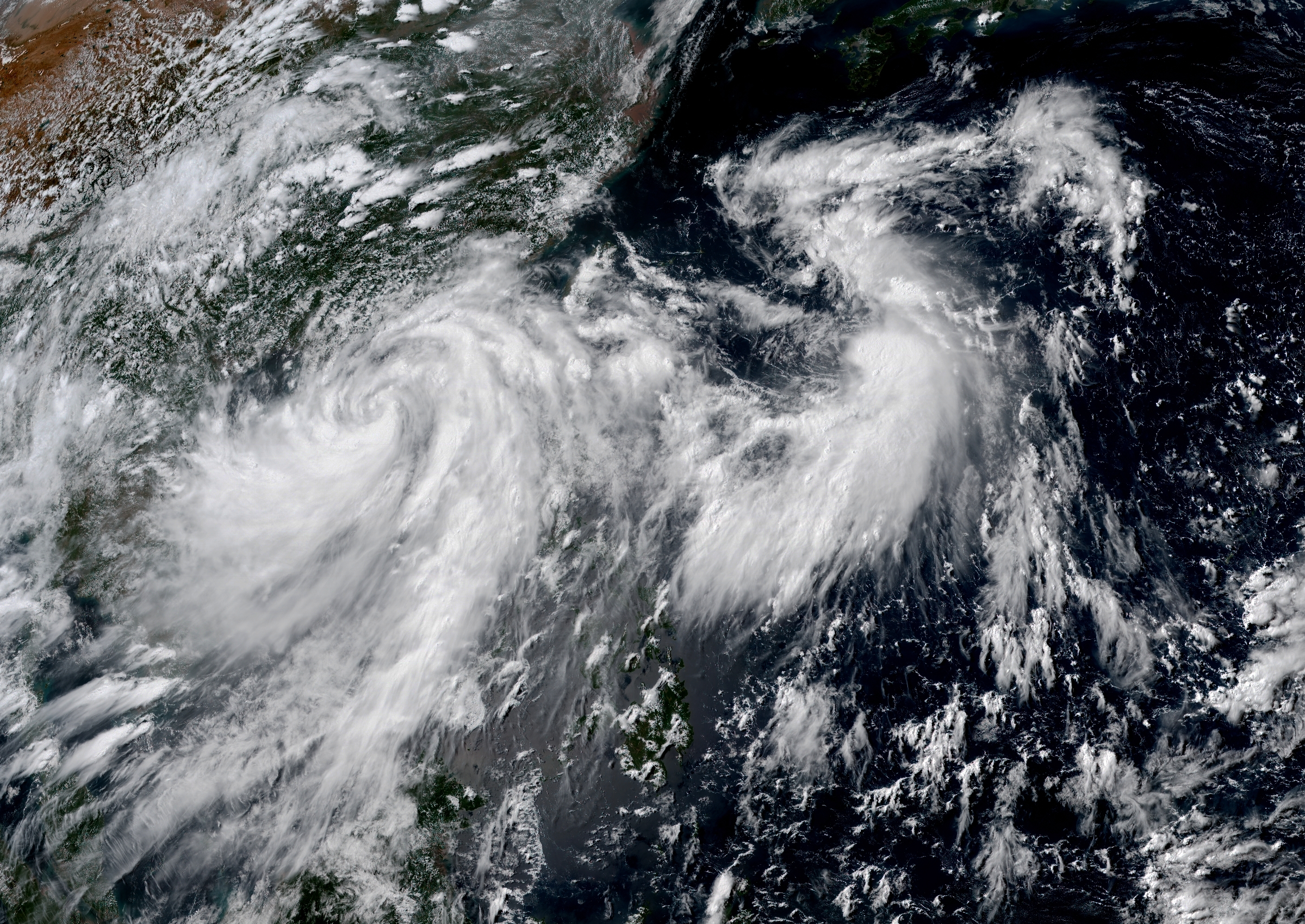
Typhoon Chaba (left) intensifying in the South China Sea, while Tropical Storm Aere (right) forms in the Philippine Sea on July 1.

After nearly a month of inactivity, a tropical depression formed northeast of Mindanao on May 30, but dissipated on the same day. Then on June 28, after another month of inactivity, a tropical depression formed west of Luzon where the PAGASA named the system as Caloy, followed by the JTWC which assigned the system as Invest 97W. Two days later, the system was designated as 04W by JTWC as it became a tropical depression. The JMA later named the system Chaba which intensified into a tropical storm in the South China Sea on June 30. Chaba continued to intensify in the South China Sea, later being upgraded into a severe tropical storm east of Hainan. Chaba's outer rainbands spawned at least three tornadoes, which impacted Shantou, Chaozhou, and Foshan. A day later, Chaba intensified into a Category 1 typhoon before it made landfall on Maoming. Shortly after landfall, Chaba lost its typhoon status and was downgrading into a severe tropical storm and to a tropical storm respectively by the JMA and the JTWC. Chaba then dissipated on July 4 as it approached Central China. Chaba killed at least 12 people when a crane vessel sunk off the coast of Hong Kong. Chaba's remnants continued travelling across mainland China and later entered the Bohai Sea where it dissipated off the coast of North Korea. By the end on the month, another tropical depression formed northeast of Northern Luzon in the Philippine Sea south of Okinawa, where the PAGASA classified the depression as Domeng upon formation. Later, the depression intensified into a tropical storm and was named Aere by the JMA. On late July 2, Aere made landfall in Okinawa, and weakened into a tropical depression as it headed towards Japan. The depression made landfall on Kyushu and continued traveling across the country. However, 3 days later, the JTWC reclassified Aere as a subtropical storm while it was located east of Japan. The storm then dissipated south of Hokkaido.

On July 24, a tropical depression formed south of Japan. The depression was short lived and dissipated the next day. On July 26, another tropical depression formed northwest of the Mariana Islands where the JTWC assigned the system as Invest 94W. As the separation of two disturbances (93W & 94W), the system was given a high chance for potential development. Three days later, the system intensified into a tropical storm which was then named Songda. The JTWC followed suit, and the storm was also classified as 06W six hours later. Songda headed northwestwards, passing over the waters of Kagoshima Prefecture on July 30. Songda dissipated on August 1 as its remnants made landfall in North Korea. Songda brought heavy rainfall over Kyushu and Shikoku regions of Japan as well as Jeju Island in South Korea. Followed by Songda, another tropical depression formed southeast of the Ryukyu Islands on July 29. The JTWC classified the new system as Invest 95W. A few days later, the PAGASA upgraded the system into a tropical depression, which was then named Ester. The JMA later named the system Trases as it was located north of Okinawa. Trases replaced Sarika after its retirement in the 2016 season, which means woodpecker. The JTWC followed suit, and the storm was also classified as 07W. As it passed over Okinawa, Trases made landfall on Jeju Island before weakening into a tropical depression until it dissipated on August 1.

In early August, a low pressure area formed southwest of Taiwan on August 1. The JTWC classified the low as Invest 96W. Two days later, the disturbance strengthened into a tropical depression according to the JMA, and the JTWC designated the depression as Tropical Depression 08W. 08W dissipated on August 4, as it made landfall on Huidong County in Guangdong. On August 8, a tropical depression formed east of Vietnam. The JMA classified the system as a tropical storm and was given the name Mulan. Mulan replaced Haima after being retired in the 2016 season, which is a type of flower (Magnolia). Mulan passed the Qiongzhou Strait before making landfall on Northern Vietnam and dissipating on August 11. On August 10, another low pressure area formed northwest of Iwo Jima. The JMA named the system as Meari as it reached tropical storm status. Meari made landfall near Shizuoka Prefecture before it transitioned into an extratropical cyclone by August 14. The storm disturbed multiple events held in Japan and caused some transportation in the country to be suspended and minor damages to houses. On August 14, the JMA began tracking a weak tropical depression that formed west of the International Date Line. The depression only lasted until the next day. On August 19, the JMA began tracking a low pressure area north of Palau. The system was then named Ma-on by the JMA as it reached tropical storm status on August 22. The storm further strengthened into a severe tropical storm on the same day. Ma-on first made landfall over Maconacon in the province of Isabela before exiting the Philippine Area of Responsibility on August 24. Ma-on then made its second landfall near Yangjiang, China the next day and its final landfall in Northern Vietnam before it was last noted on August 26. Ma-on killed at seven people in the Philippines and Vietnam and caused moderate damages to infrastructures in both countries. On August 21 after Ma-on formed, another tropical depression formed northeast of Guam. Due to favoritable conditions, the depression rapidly intensified into a tropical storm and was named Tokage by the JMA. Three days later, the JTWC upgraded Tokage into a typhoon, with the JMA following suit 3 hours later. Tokage reached its peak intensity as a Category 3 before entering hostile environments east of Japan. Tokage became an extratropical storm on August 25 before it was last noted south of Alaska. Additionally, on August 22, a tropical depression formed north of Typhoon Tokage. However, it dissipated on the same day. Nearing the end of August on the 28th, a tropical depression formed southeast of Japan. The depression was then named Hinnamnor by the JMA 6 hours later upon formation. The storm rapidly intensified due to warm waters and strengthened into the basin's first Category 5 super typhoon. Hinnamnor headed west towards the Ryuku Islands and stalled south of the prefecture while partly maintaining its strength. At that time on August 30, another tropical depression formed south of Typhoon Hinnamnor. The depression was later named Gardo by the PAGASA upon formation. Gardo was short lived and its structure was absorbed by Typhoon Hinnamnor. Hinnamnor later headed north in the East China Sea and restrengthened into a Category 3-equivalent typhoon. The storm then made landfall near Busan in South Korea and the JMA declared Hinnamnor as an extratropical low as it was located in the Sea of Japan. Hinnamnor caused widespread damage across East Asia mostly in South Korea and Japan. Additionally, the typhoon killed at least 3 people and left 10 people missing.

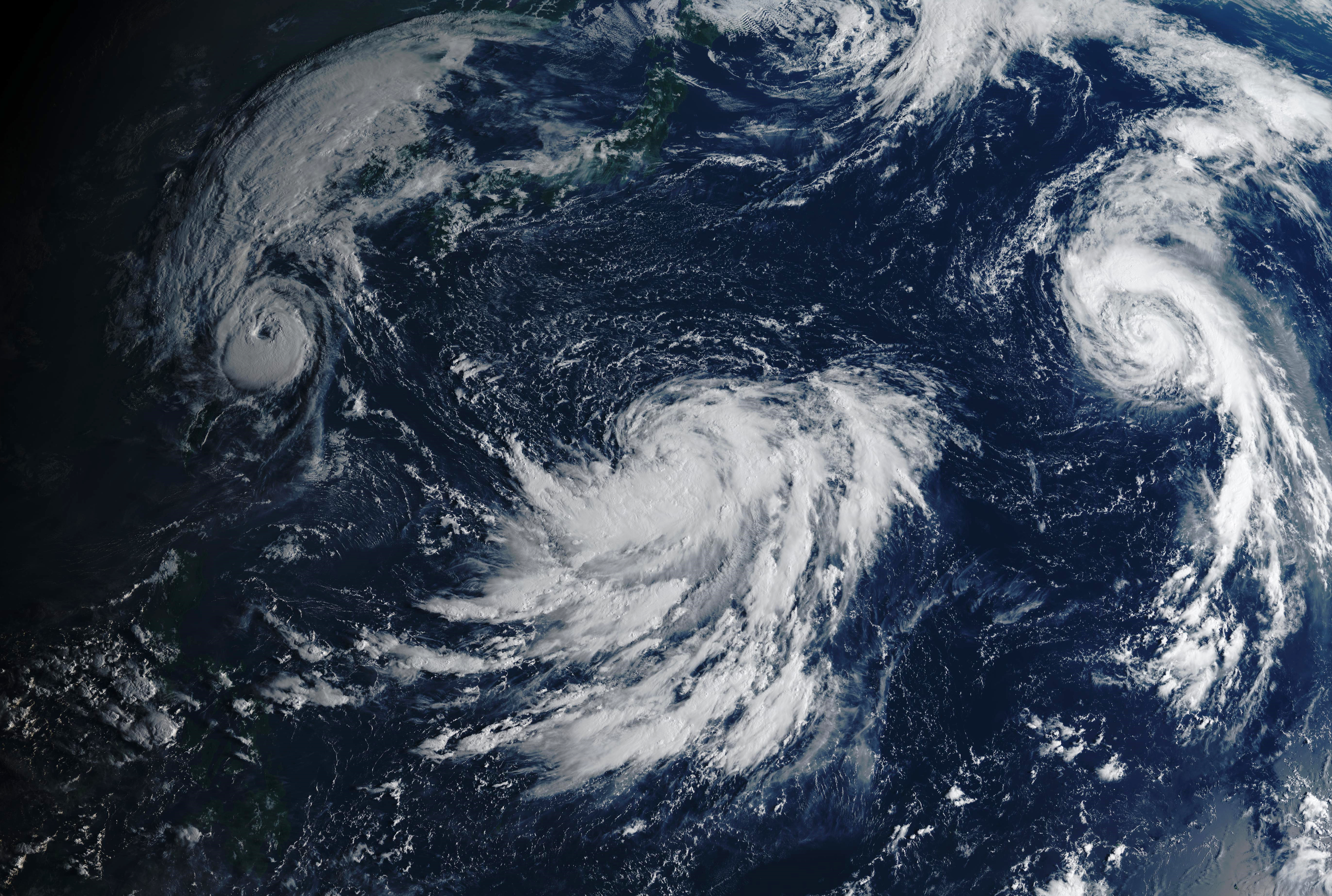
Three tropical cyclones active on September 13: Typhoon Muifa (left), Tropical Storm Nanmadol (center), and Typhoon Merbok (right)

On September 5, a tropical depression formed near Iwo-To. The JTWC designated the system as Invest 91W upon formation. The depression later intensified into a tropical storm and was named Muifa by the JMA. Muifa then intensified further into a Category 1 typhoon as it was located south of Okinawa. The typhoon reached its peak intensity as a Category 3 typhoon and passed the Yaeyama Islands on September 12 as it headed north slowly. Mufia then slightly regained its strength in the East China Sea and made landfall near Shanghai two days later. The typhoon suspended several flights and port activities in Shanghai. Mufia also became the strongest typhoon to strike Shanghai, beating the previous record set by Typhoon Gloria in 1949. On September 9, a tropical depression formed west of Wake Island. The JTWC followed suit and designated the depression as 15W. The depression was then named Merbok as it reached tropical storm status. Merbok then further intensified into a Category 1 typhoon before it headed north and transitioned into an extratropical cyclone by September 15. Merbok's remnants later brought hurricane-force winds along Alaska. It then entered the Bering Sea, generating a dangerous storm surge which inundated several coastal villages and towns. Despite the impact, no injuries were reported. On September 11, another tropical depression formed near east of Iwo-To. The JTWC followed suit and designated the system as 16W on the next day. The depression later strengthened into a tropical storm and was named Nanmadol by the JMA. Nanmadol then intensified into a Category 1 typhoon on the same day. It further reached its peak intensity as a Category 4 typhoon as it approached Japan. The approaching typhoon prompted the JMA to issue a special warning which advised at least 4 million people to evacuate. Nanmadol then made landfall on the island of Kyushu. The typhoon then turned east before weakening further on September 19. Nanmadol killed at least 2 people and left more than 70 people injured. Additionally, the typhoon left more than 200,000 people without electricity. On September 20, a tropical disturbance turned into a tropical depression according to the JMA. On the next day, JTWC classified the system as 17W. Two days later, the depression was named Talas upon reaching tropical storm status. However, Talas weakened back into a tropical depression and dissipated as it approached southern Japan. Despite its short duration, Talas killed at least three people and caused a power outage across Japan's Shizuoka Prefecture. On September 21, the JMA began tracking another tropical depression which formed in the Philippine Sea. The depression was in a favorable environment for development and made the JTWC to classify the system as 18W on the next day. As the system formed within the Philippine Area of Responsibility (PAR), it was given the name Karding by the agency. On September 23, the depression was named Noru. Noru then entered a period of rapid intensification and briefly intensified into a Category 5-equivalent super typhoon as it approached the Philippines. Noru made its first landfall over the Polillo Islands in the municipality of Burdeos, Quezon. Shortly after, Noru slightly weakened into a Category 4-equivalent typhoon shortly before its second landfall over Dingalan, Aurora. Noru then rapidly weakened to a Category 1-equivalent typhoon while traversing Luzon before entering the South China Sea, where the typhoon re-intensified back into a Category 4-equivalent typhoon. Noru then weakened again to a Category 2-equivalent typhoon before making a final landfall in Vietnam on September 27, near Da Nang. After landfall, Noru rapidly weakened before dissipating in central Thailand on September 30. Shortly after Noru's formation the JMA began tracking another tropical depression southeast of Japan. The depression was then named Kulap. It achieved severe tropical storm status and the JTWC went further, classifying it as a Category 1 typhoon shortly after. Without reaching any habitable area, the cyclone was downgraded to an extratropical cyclone. Days later, the JTWC classified another disturbance as Invest 98W which formed in the Philippine Sea. This disturbance turned into a tropical depression and as it entered the PAGASA area, the storm was named Luis. Luis left the Philippine territory shortly after without affecting the archipelago. Outside the PAR, the cyclone gained strength and was classified as a tropical storm which was then named Roke by the JMA. It quickly reached Category 1 strength and hours later on September 29, as a Category 2 typhoon. The intensification did not last long and like Kulap, it did not impact any areas. Roke was downgraded to an extratropical cyclone. But on October 3, what was left of Roke turned into a subtropical storm.

On October 11, a depression named Maymay by the PAGASA, formed off the coast of the Philippines and dissipated the next day. Despite the depression being short-lived, two people were killed from the storm and caused infrastructure and agricultural damage. On the next day, another tropical depression classified as 21W formed east of the Mariana Islands. 21W was also short lived and never made landfall. On October 13, another tropical depression formed west of the Philippines in the South China Sea. The depression reached tropical storm status and was named Sonca by the JMA. Sonca made landfall in Quang Ngai Province, Vietnam and dissipated shortly after. Sonca killed at least 10 people in the region due to the heavy precipitation. On the same day, another tropical depression formed in the Philippine Sea. The storm was named Nesat on October 15, as the storm passed just north of the island of Luzon. Nesat then entered the South China Sea where it intensified further into a typhoon. Nesat reached its peak intensity as a Category 2 typhoon and began losing its strength as it approached Vietnam. Nesat dissipated on October 20, off the coast of Hainan Island. During its lifespan, Nesat caused minor damage across the Philippines, Taiwan, Vietnam, and Hong Kong. However, no fatalities were reported. On October 18, Tropical Storm Haitang formed after interacting with a non-tropical low and degenerating Tropical Depression 21W since October 14. Haitang was also short lived and became extratropical the next day. On the same day Haitang formed, another tropical depression formed south of Okinawa. The depression was classified as 25W as it headed west before it dissipated in the South China Sea without intensifying further. There were two reported deaths due to 25W in the Philippines. On October 26, a tropical depression formed in the Philippine Sea. As the system approached the Philippines, the JMA declared the low as a tropical storm where it named it Nalgae. Nalgae then headed northwest making multiple landfalls in the Philippines. It then emerged over the South China Sea and entered the South China Sea where it strengthened into a Category 1 typhoon. As the typhoon approached the coast of China, Nalgae weakened back into a tropical storm and made its final landfall over Xiangzhou District, Zhuhai. Nalgae became the first tropical cyclone to make landfall over the country since Nepartak in 2003. Nalgae also caused heavy damage and flooding across the Philippines and killed at least 154 people in the country alone. On October 28, a tropical depression formed southeast of the Philippines. On November 1, the JMA classified the system as a tropical storm and named it Banyan. Banyan however weakened back into a tropical depression the next day and dissipated before reaching the Philippines.On November 11, a tropical depression formed near Wake Island. The JMA later named the system Yamaneko as it reached tropical storm status. Yamaneko was a short lived system and dissipated three days later. Yamaneko was an out to sea storm, harming no land area near it, and a relatively weak system in terms of intensity.

On December 9, a tropical depression formed east of the Philippines. The system continued to drift towards the Philippines and began to turn eastwards, where the system was named Pakhar by the JMA and Rosal by the PAGASA, as it reached tropical storm status. Pakhar's close approach to the Bicol Region and Polillo, Quezon prompted the PAGASA to raise Tropical Cyclone Warning Signal (TCWS) No. 1 in some areas in Southern Luzon. Pakhar killed 8 people indirectly from a flood that swept away a jeep in Rizal as it was making its close approach to the archipelago. Pakhar then intensified further, but later rapidly weakening and dissipating by December 12 from high vertical wind shear and dry air sent by the northeast monsoon, making its circulation exposed.

=== North Indian Ocean ===
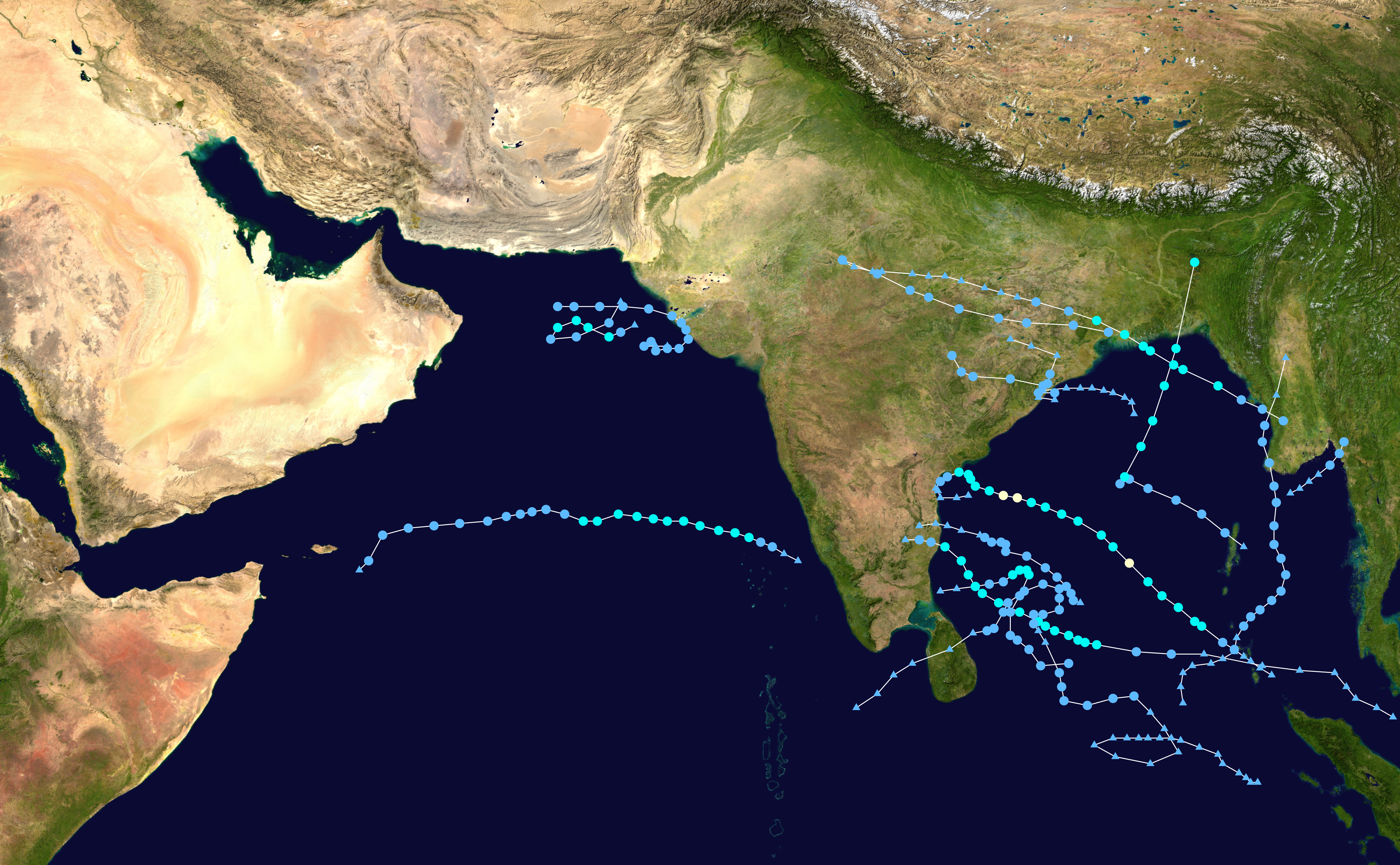
2022 North Indian Ocean cyclone season summary map

The Northern Indian Ocean cyclone season commenced on March 3 by the formation of Depression BOB 01 in the Southwest Bay of Bengal. It was a rare depression and only the ninth such system to form in the month of March since reliable records began in 1891. It was also the first system to form in the northern hemisphere. The depression peaked as a deep depression and dissipated on March 6 near the Indian coast. On March 20, another depression classified as BOB 02 formed in the Andaman Sea. It made landfall on Myanmar before dissipating. The season became the first season in the Indian Ocean basin to witness two systems forming during the month of March.

After more than 1 month of inactivity, a westerly wind burst occurred which resulted in the formation of a depression, which eventually became Cyclone Karim to its south and another depression which formed off the coast of Andaman and Nicobar Islands which was classified as BOB 03 by the IMD. On the morning of May 8, BOB 03 strengthened into the basin's first cyclonic storm and received the name Asani by the IMD, which means "wrath" in Sinhala. Nine hours later, the JTWC upgraded the system to a Category 1 tropical cyclone. Soon, the IMD upgraded Asani into a severe cyclonic storm. As Asani approached the Indian coast, the system began to weaken due to severe wind shear and dry air. Moreover, causing Asani to stall. Asani eventually made landfall in Andhra Pradesh on May 11 as a weak cyclonic storm killing at least 3 people. The system eventually dissipated the next day.

On May 19, a depression classified as BOB 04 formed over the Gulf of Martaban. The system made landfall over the Southern Burmese coast and dissipated the next day. After nearly two months of inactivity, a disorganized low pressure area formed off the coast of Saurashtra in Gujarat on July 16. The JTWC designated the system as Invest 96A. On the next day, the systems intensified into a monsoon depression, where it was classified as ARB 01 by the IMD. The depression was very weak and failed to intensify due to unfavorable conditions until it dissipated on July 18.

On August 9, a monsoon low formed over the northwestern region of the Bay of Bengal. The IMD classified the system as BOB 05 upon formation. BOB 05 made landfall on Odisha before weakening into a remnant low. A few days later, a sudden surge of equatorial Rossby waves and Kelvin waves formed with the two waves forming a low pressure area in the Arabian Sea. The JTWC classified the low as Invest 98A. The depression was then classified as a tropical storm by the JTWC but remained as a depression per the IMD. The system eventually dissipated on August 13 off the Indian coastline. On the next day, another low pressure area formed north of the Bay of Bengal. The system was then classified as BOB 06. BOB 06 made landfall near Digha shortly after its designation. However, due to the brown ocean effect, low wind shear and moisture, the system maintained its depression status over land for three days. On August 17, the depression finally weakened into a well-marked low pressure over southwestern Rajasthan. The storm caused widespread flooding across many states in India. On August 18, another low pressure area formed near the coast of India. The system at that time had tropical storm winds and was classified as 04B by the JTWC. The IMD followed suit and classified the system as BOB 07. The depression made landfall near Digha and also maintained its structure for another two days until it became a low pressure area. Its remnants later moved into Pakistan and have influenced in worsening the ongoing flooding in the country.

On September 11, a depression classified as Land Depression 02 formed over Odisha. However, it was short lived and dissipated the next day.

On October 17, the IMD began monitoring an area of low-pressure which was located in the Bay of Bengal. The IMD classified the system as BOB 09 On October 23, as the system began heading north, BOB 09 strengthened into a cyclonic storm which was then named Sitrang by the IMD; being the second named storm in the basin since Asani in May. Sitrang was contributed by Thailand which means leaf in Thai language. Sitrang then made landfall over Bangladesh on October 25 before weakening back into a deep depression. Sitrang then dissipated over Northeast India on the same day. Sitrang caused heavy damage across Bangladesh. At least 56 fatalities were reported with over 8 million customers left without power.

On November 20, a depression classified as BOB 08 by the IMD formed in the Bay of Bengal. The depression struggled to intensify and made landfall over India before dissipating.

On December 6, the IMD stated that a tropical depression formed in the Bay of Bengal and designated the system as BOB 09. The JTWC followed suit and began to monitor the system. On the next day the IMD classified the system as a cyclonic storm and named it Mandous. As it continued heading west, Mandous further strengthened into a Severe Cyclonic Storm. The storm later made landfall near Chennai, India as a Deep Depression before dissipating inland. Four deaths were reported from the cyclone.

The remnants of Mandous transferred across southern India and into the Arabian Sea. The system quickly developed and was designated as Deep Depression ARB 03 by IMD. The storm unexpectedly rapidly developed and the JTWC designated it as Cyclone 07A, peaking with winds of 60 mph (95 km/h), according to the JTWC, and a 3-minute mean of 35 mph.

=== South-West Indian Ocean ===
==== January – June ====
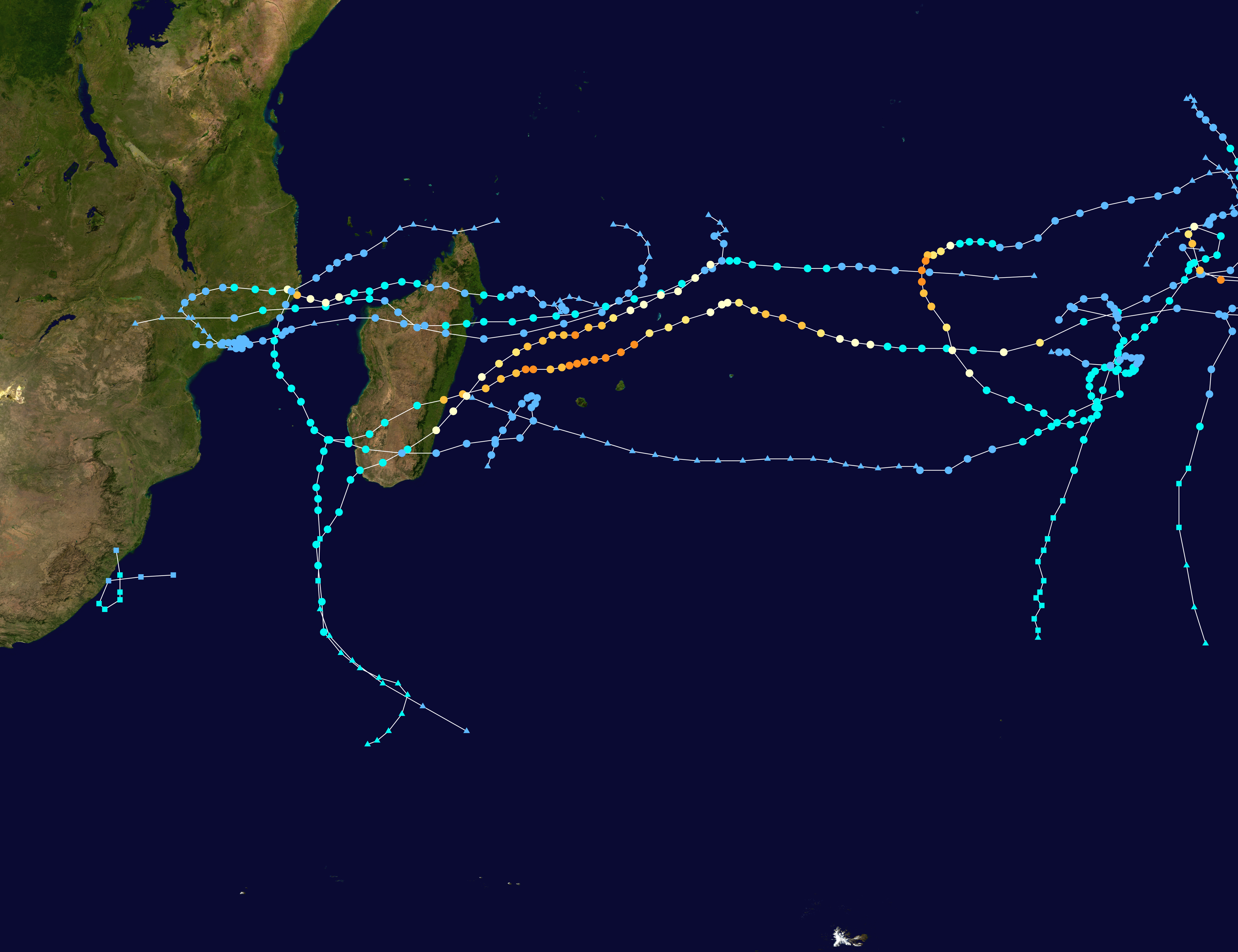
2021–22 South-West Indian Ocean cyclone season summary map

On January 20, A zone of disturbed weather formed northeast of Madagascar making it the first system of the season. The storm then made landfall over Madagascar while it struggled to develop. After entering the Mozambique Channel, the system developed into Tropical Storm Ana which became the latest first named storm in the basin since the 1997–98 South-West Indian Ocean cyclone season. Ana then made landfall over Mozambique and rapidly weakened. The storm killed 142 people and caused severe damage.

Shortly after Ana, Cyclone Batsirai formed northwest of Mauritius. It intensified into a Category 2 tropical cyclone but was downgraded back to a tropical storm status due to its eye collapsing. As Batsirai approached Réunion and Mauritius, the storm rapidly intensified into a high-end Category 4 cyclone which became the first major cyclone of the year. Batsirai then made severe landfall on Madagascar, destroying many buildings and disrupting power and communication services on the island. After landfall, Batsirai weakened as it travelled across Madagascar. The storm, in total killed at least 123 people. On February 7 at 06:00 UTC, Batsirai dissipated, but, later in the day, at 18:00 UTC, Batsirai reformed. However, it transitioned into a post-tropical cyclone the next day.

During the beginning of February, Tropical Storm Cliff formed, however it dissipated two days later without affecting any landmass, with the closest being Diego Garcia. Later in the month, Tropical Storm Dumako formed. Dumako intensified into a Moderate Tropical Storm before making landfall over Madagascar which was already devastated by Cyclone Batsirai weeks prior. On February 15, Cyclone Emnati formed and made landfall on Southern Madagascar. A day later, Tropical Storm Fezile formed, which first originated from the Australian basin, however it struggled to maintain its structure and dissipated 2 days later. Meanwhile, Cyclone Vernon entered the MFR's area of responsibility, and Tropical Depression 08 formed. Due to the Fujiwara interaction with Vernon, 08 dissipated on February 27, and Vernon stayed away from any landmass and dissipated on March 3 due to the loss of subtropical characteristics at the time.

During the month of March, a tropical depression formed northwards of Mauritius on March 5, and intensified to Cyclone Gombe as a Moderate Tropical Storm two days later. It made its first landfall on Northern Madagascar, and weakened into a tropical depression. The next day, Gombe intensified again as a Moderate Tropical Storm and further into an Intense Tropical Cyclone. It made its second landfall over Nampula Province before its final landfall in Mozambique and was downgraded as an Overland Depression two days later. On March 17, Gombe briefly reorganized itself as a tropical depression in the Mozambique Channel but dissipated thereafter. On March 20, Cyclone Halima formed and reached its peak intensity as a Category 4 tropical cyclone or an Intense tropical cyclone. It dissipated on April 1 without affecting any landmass.

During the month of April, a low pressure area formed off the southeast coast of South Africa on April 11. The next day, it intensified into an unofficially subtropical depression and was named Issa by the MFR. Issa looped around the coast of South Africa before dissipated the next day weakening further. In doing so, it exacerbated catastrophic flooding in KwaZulu-Natal that overall killed at least 435 people. On April 21, a tropical disturbance formed near the Comoros and was designated as 12 by the MFR. The system first made landfall in Nampula and Zambezia Province off the coast of Mozambique before it intensified into a tropical storm and was named Jasmine three days later. On April 24, Jasmine reached its peak intensity as a severe tropical storm, before it weakened into a tropical storm. The storm made landfall in Southern Madagascar before it was downgraded into an overland depression two days later, and killed at least 3 people. Jasmine's remnants continued travelling across Madagascar before dissipating on April 28.

During the first week of May, an off-season system classified as 36U entered the SWIO basin from the Australian basin, and the MFR designated the system as 13 on the same day. A few days later, it intensified into a Moderate Tropical Storm which was then named Karim. Karim later exited the basin and reentered the Australian basin on May 7 which made it the last system of the season.

==== July – December ====
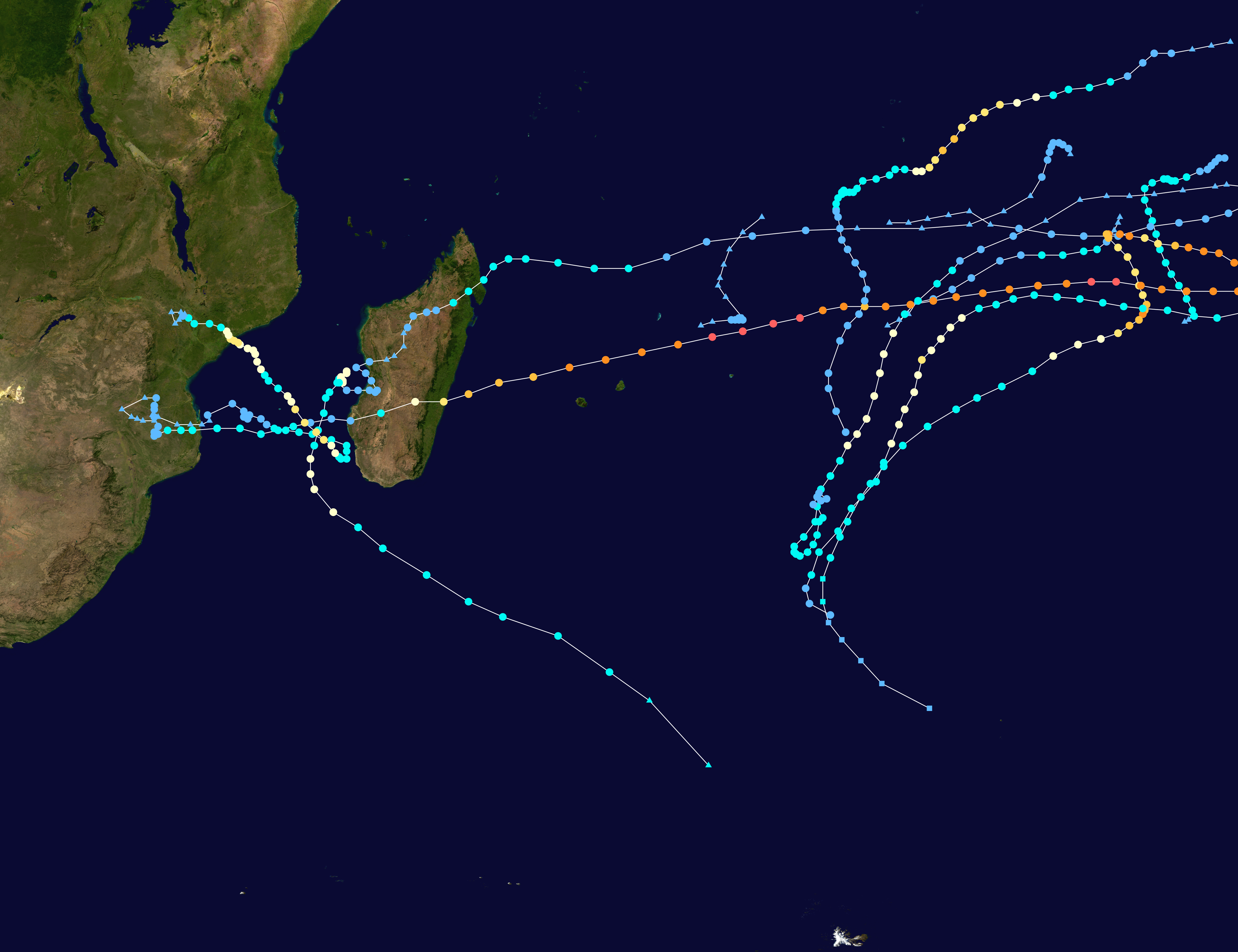
2022–23 South-West Indian Ocean cyclone season summary map

The season began on September 23 with the formation of Ashley. Ashley formed after the near-equatorial trough produced a weak tropical low in the Indian Ocean. Ashley reached its peak, with 10-minute sustained winds of 75 km/h (45 mph). It then weakened back into a low due to the combination of severe wind shear and dry air. The MFR stopped advisories on the system on September 28, however it continued to track Ashley's remnants until it was last noted on September 30.

On October 2, the MFR began monitoring a disturbance associated with the convergence of the westerly wind burst. The system was later named Balita after convection increased arounff the system. Balita dissipated on October 13 after its structure collapsed due to wind shear.

On November 5, Tropical Low 02U which was being tracked by the MFR entered the South-West Indian Ocean basin from the Australian region. The MFR reclassified the low as Tropical Depression 03. The low continued heading west before it degenerated into a remnant low.

During December 21, Severe Tropical Cyclone Darian moved into the South-West Indian Ocean, where it was classified as a Very Intense Tropical Cyclone by MFR, with 10-minute sustained winds of 225 km/h(140 mph) and minimum barometric pressure of 920 mbar. On December 30, it transitioned into an extratropical cyclone (heading poleward) without impacted land.

=== Australian Region ===
==== January – June ====
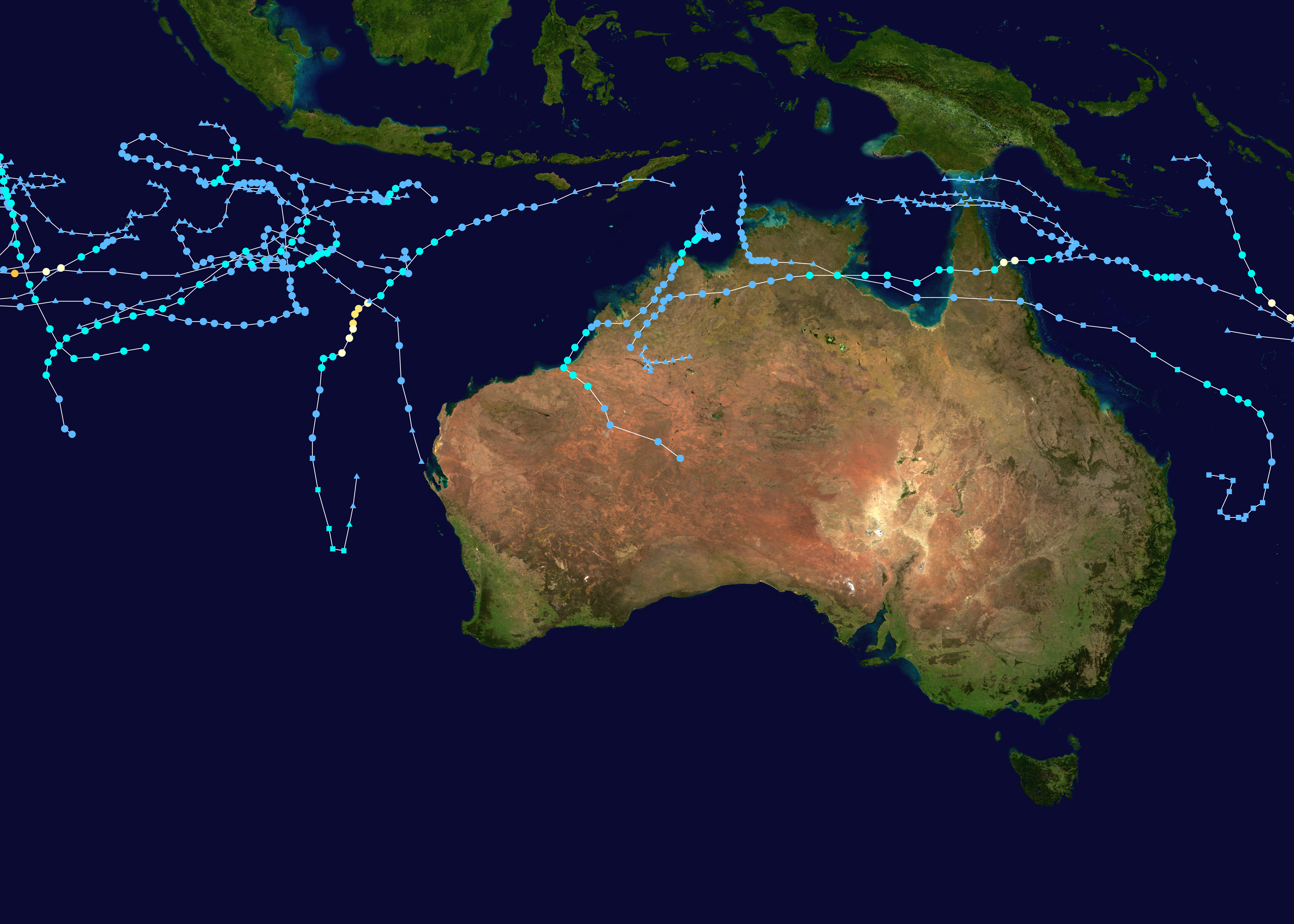
2021–22 Australian region cyclone season summary map

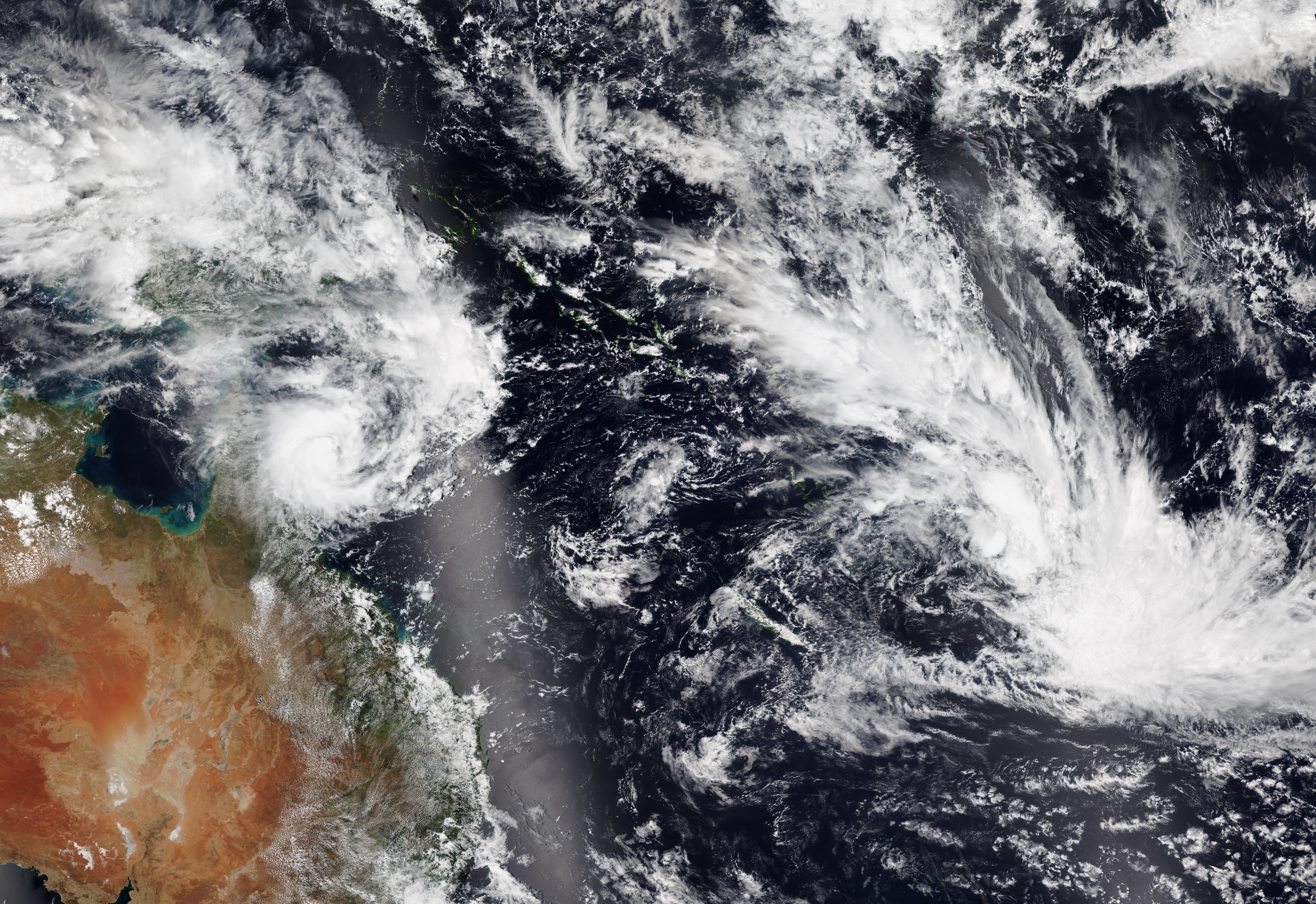
A satellite image of Cyclone Cody (right) and Cyclone Tiffany (left) active on January 9, 2022.

The season began with Cyclone Seth and a tropical low from the Australian region, which persisted into 2022. The low dissipated on January 3, while Seth remained active until January 6. On January 9, Tropical Cyclone Tiffany formed, as a Category 1 tropical cyclone, becoming the first named storm in the basin. Tiffany first originated in the Gulf of Carpentaria before curving in the Coral Sea. Tiffany then struck Northern Queensland as a Category 1 tropical cyclone before traveling across Northern Australia where it dissipated. On January 13, 11U formed but dissipated the next day. On January 22, two more tropical lows formed where one dissipated a few days later, while the other low entered the South-West Indian Ocean basin where it intensified into Cyclone Batsirai. Additionally, four more tropical lows classified as 16U, 14U, 17U, and 18U formed. 14U dissipated on February 6, and 16U and 18U entered the South Pacific Basin. Later, on February 12, 17U dissipated. The next day, a new tropical low formed, and the BoM designated it as 19U and exited the basin. On February 23, Tropical Low 22U quickly developed and was named Vernon by the BoM. Afterward, the system underwent rapid intensification and peaked as a Category 4 severe tropical cyclone before interacting with another disturbance to the northwest. A day later, tropical low 20U was designated and 23U was monitored in the Timor Sea, which later became Tropical Cyclone Anika. Anika made landfall northeast of Kalumburu before the second landfall on Kimberley, and the third landfall east of Pardoo. Due to the brown ocean effect, Anika briefly developed an inner cone and dissipated on March 3.

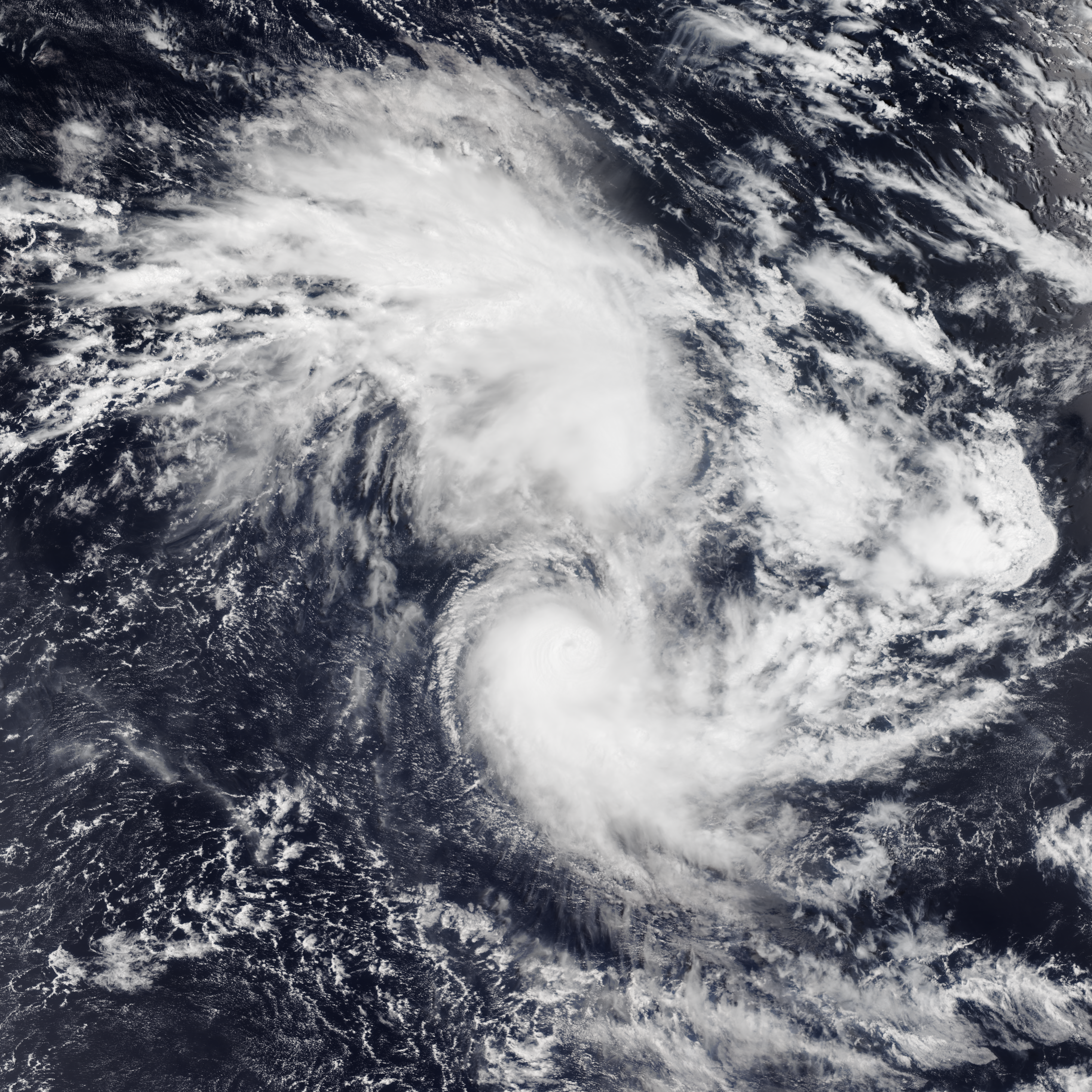
A satellite image of Cyclone Vernon (bottom) and Tropical Storm 08 (top) undergoing a Fujiwhara interaction on February 26, 2022.

By the end of February, Tropical Depression 08 from the South-West Indian Ocean basin briefly moved westward while undergoing a Fujiwara interaction with Vernon. It was classified as 25U. A day later, 26U formed east of Christmas Island and attained tropical storm winds, but high easterly wind shear caused the system to disintegrate and dissipated south of Java in March 4.

On March 11, Tropical Cyclone Billy formed south of Java, but stayed away from any landmass and dissipated northwest of Australia. A few days later a tropical low developed over Indonesia and was named Charlotte. Charlotte reached its peak as a Category 4 tropical storm on the Australian scale before weakening.

On April 16, a tropical low formed near the Top End in the Gulf of Carpentaria. However it was short lived and dissipated three days later. Two days later, another tropical low formed east of Christmas Island and was designated as 34U by the BoM. 34U mostly stayed at sea during its lifespan and dissipated on April 29.

By the start of May, an off-season tropical low formed west of the Cocos Islands on May 6 and was designated as 36U by the BoM. 36U later entered the South-West Indian Ocean basin and was named Karim by the MFR. Karim however, reentered the Australian basin the next day. Karim reached its peak intensity as a Category 2 cyclone without affecting any landmass. On May 11, Karim's structure started to disintegrate as it entered cooler waters and entered high wind shear. On May 28, another off-season tropical low formed near Christmas Island. The low was short lived and dissipated three days later ending the Australian cyclone season.

==== July – December ====
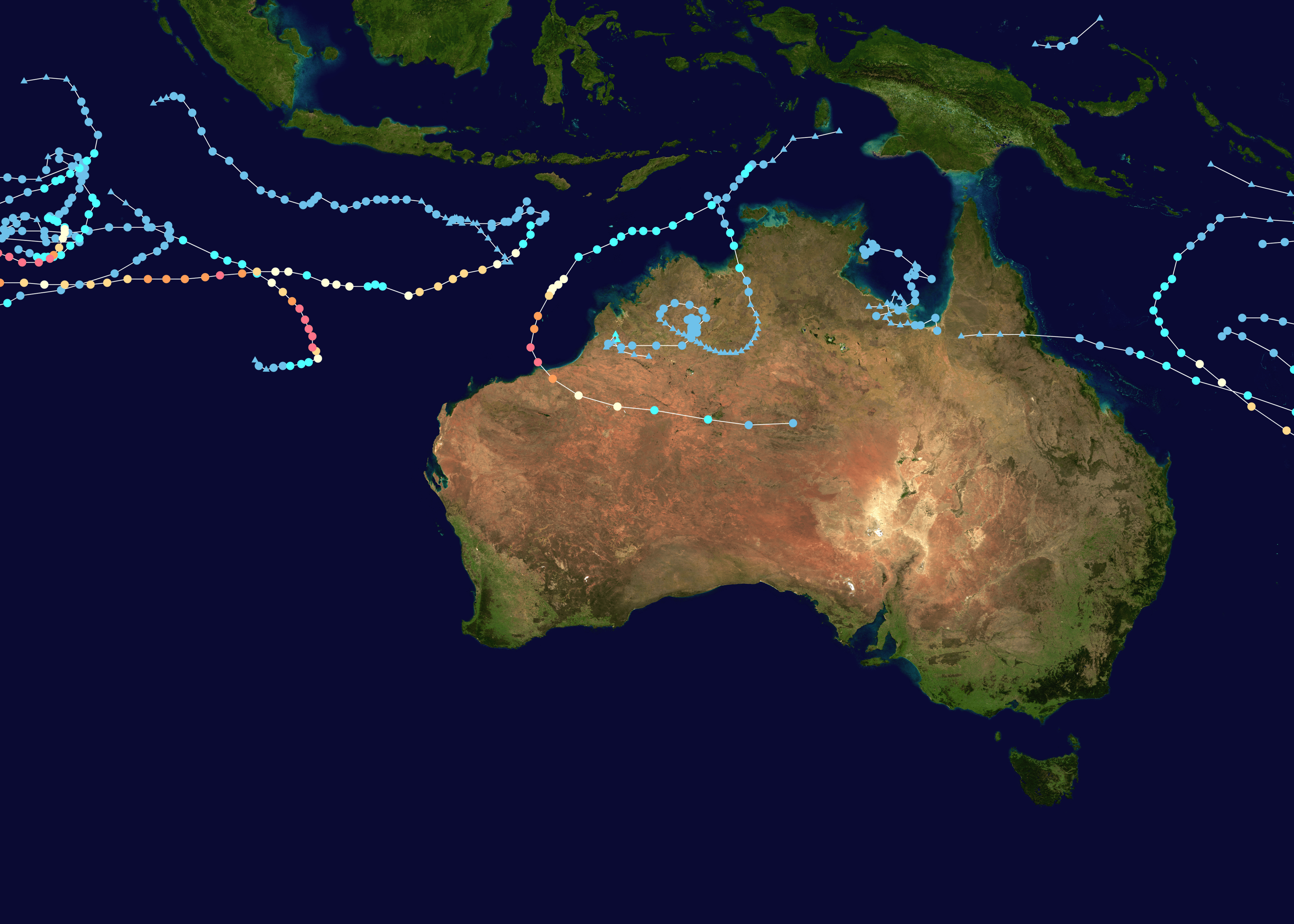
2022–23 Australian region cyclone season summary map

The season had an exceptionally early start with a tropical low developing on July 27, situated in the northwest corner of the region. The JTWC designated the system as Invest 95S. The next day, the system intensified into a tropical cyclone, which was then designated as 01U by the BoM. 01U lasted until July 31.

On November 1, the BoM began tracking a tropical low that was located off the coast of Indonesia. The BoM classified the system as Tropical Low 02U two days later. The JTWC called it Tropical Cyclone 04S. The low continued heading east before entering the South-West Indian Ocean basin, where the BoM stopped tracking the system. On November 15, the BoM detected a very weak tropical low that was located south of Indonesia. It was a long lived system, and paralleled the Indonesian coast before it dissipated north of Australia without intensifying on November 26. There was also another tropical low that formed in the Gulf of Carpentaria, but did not develop further. On December 13, Tropical Low 05U formed, and was given the name Darian after intensifying into a Category 1 Tropical Cyclone. On December 18, it became the first Severe Tropical Cyclone (Australian Scale) of the 2022–23 Australian region cyclone season. Favorable environment led to rapid intensification, causing it to reach Category 4 Strength (SSHWS Scale), and Category 5 (Australian Scale). Soon after, it exited the BoM's area of responsibility, and entered into the Southwest Indian Ocean Basin. On December 20, a tropical low formed over the Timor Sea, which later intensified into Category 1 Tropical Cyclone, therefore being assigned the name Ellie. After Ellie made landfall in northwestern Australia, its circulation remained intact, and headed southward over Australia, then north-west-westward, and then began curving northeastward.

=== South Pacific Ocean ===
==== January – June ====
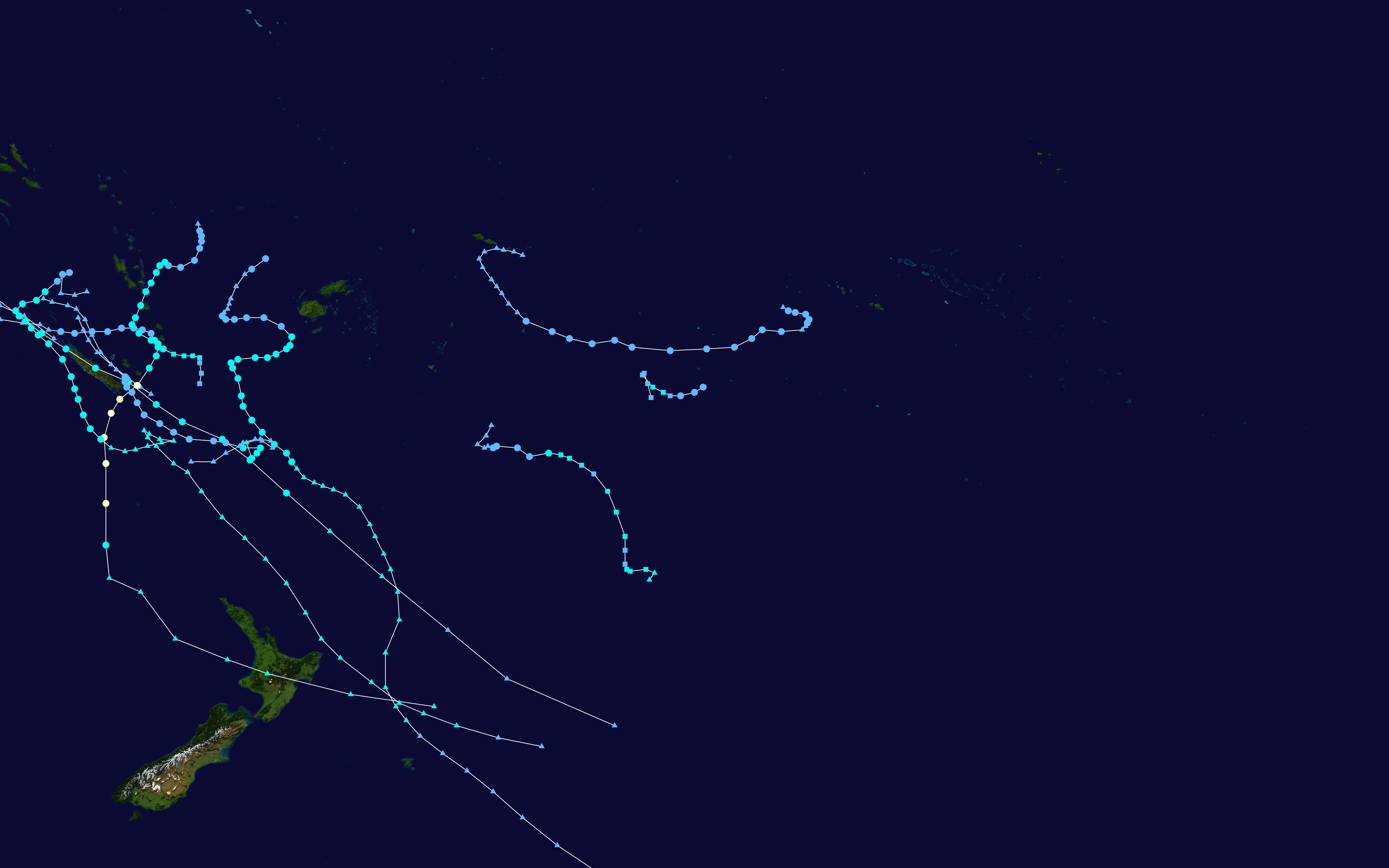
2021–22 South Pacific cyclone season summary map

On January 5, a tropical disturbance which was designated as 03F formed and was named Cyclone Cody, making it the first system of 2022. Until the end of the month, three depressions classified as 04F, 05F, 06F formed. However, they were all short lived.

During the start of February, a tropical low from the Australian basin which was classified as 16U was reclassified as 07F after it entered the basin. The low then dissipated near New Caledonia. A few days later, another low from the Australian basin entered the basin which was then reclassified as 08F. The low then intensified into a Category 1 tropical cyclone on the Australian scale which was then named Dovi by the FMS. Dovi then intensified into its peak strength as a Category 4 severe tropical cyclone, before making landfall on New Zealand, causing minor flooding. Dovi also caused widespread flooding in the countries of Vanuatu and New Caledonia.

Two weeks later, a tropical disturbance formed west of Vanuatu and designated as 09F by FMS, and intensified as a Tropical Depression and made landfall in New Caledonia. On March 3, it was intensified as a Category 1 tropical cyclone and named it Eva. A day later, Eva weakened into a Subtropical Depression and dissipated on March 5 due to the cooler waters and loss of subtropical characteristics.

Almost a month later, a tropical disturbance formed northwest of Port Vila in Vanuatu near the Australian basin. It was classified as 10F per FMS and 31U by the BoM. The system then intensified into a tropical storm and was named Fili by the FMS. Fili made a very close approach to the island of New Caledonia, but never made landfall. It reached its peak intensity as a Category 2 cyclone on the Australian scale before weakening southeast of New Caledonia. Fili dissipated on April 29.

On May 16, an off-season tropical disturbance formed northeast of Vanuatu and was designated as 11F by the FMS. 11F then intensified into a tropical cyclone and was named Gina. Gina reached its peak intensity as a Category 1 cyclone on the Australian scale before weakening due to high wind shear which deteriorated its structure. Gina dissipated on May 21 which made it the final storm in the basin. The storm caused minor flooding in Vanuatu along with its airport which caused flights to be cancelled.

==== July – December ====
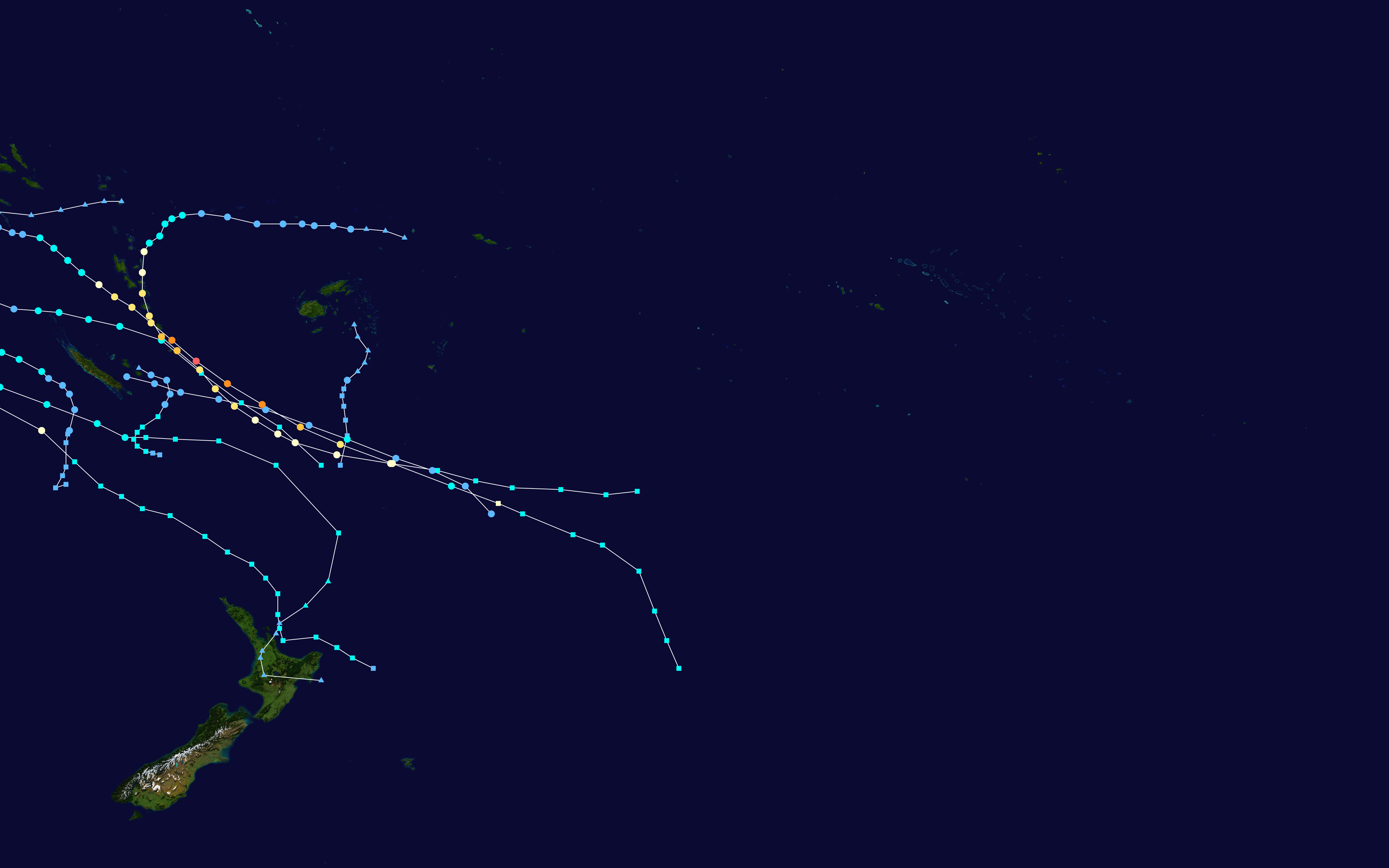
2022–23 South Pacific cyclone season summary map

On December 7, the FMS began to monitor a weak low pressure area that was located south of Suva, Fiji. The system began to organize and was classified as 01F. It later moved into TCWC Wellington's area of responsibility, where it was reclassified as a deepening non-tropical low. It was last noted on December 13, near New Zealand.

Late on December 29, the FMS reported that Tropical Disturbance 02F had developed to the south of Vanuatu. The JTWC dubbed it as Invest 91P, and gave it a low chance for development, although in a favorable environment, due to the system having a fully obscured LLC, although the JTWC saw new convection forming, as well as expecting the system to deepen in the next 2 days. The JTWC estimated surface winds of 23–27 knots (26–31 mph). It transitioned into a subtropical storm at around 03:00 UTC on December 30, however the agency gave the system a low chance to develop into tropical cyclone due to persistent unfavorable environment. The system then moved into TCWC Wellington's area of responsibility on the next day, where it was reclassified as a non-tropical low.

=== South Atlantic Ocean ===
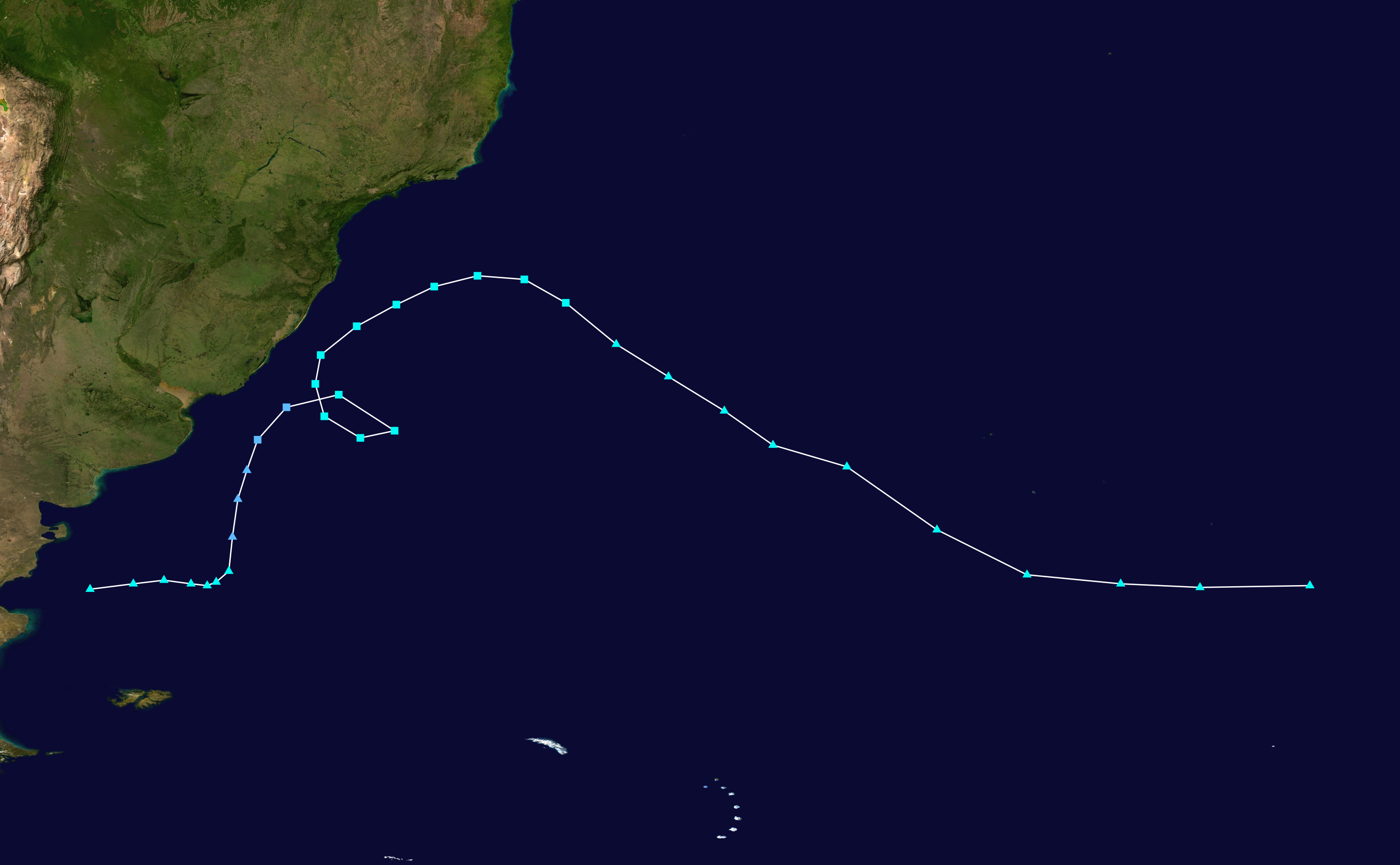
Track map of Subtropical Storm Yakecan

On May 17, an extratropical cyclone made a retrograde movement, obtained subtropical characteristics and turned into a subtropical storm, named Yakecan by the Brazilian Navy. Yakecan struck the Brazilian state of Santa Catarina and became the sixteenth storm to hit the area since Cyclone Catarina in 2004. Yakecan also killed two people, with the first death being reported in Uruguay and the other being in Brazil before reaching the mainland. It was also the last name to use regular names since 2011.

== Systems ==
=== January ===
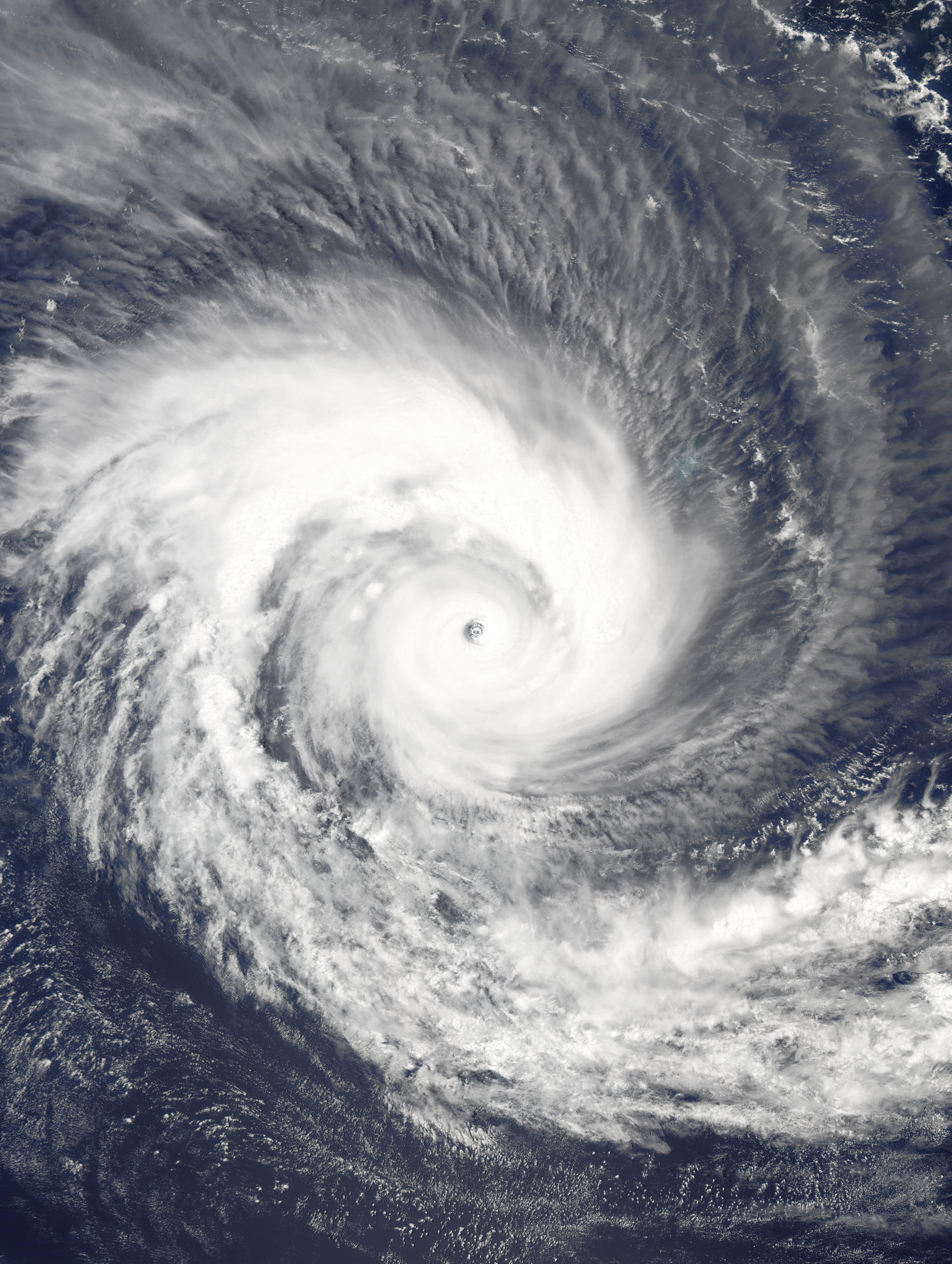
Cyclone Batsirai

January was very active, featuring eleven systems with four of them being named. Two systems from 2021, Cyclone Seth and a tropical low from the Australian region persisted into 2022. The first storm of the year started off with Cyclone Cody, which formed northwest of Fiji. The Australian basin saw the formation of Cyclone Tiffany, which affected much of Northern Queensland during the first week of the month. In the South-West Indian Ocean, Tropical Storm Ana became the latest first named storm in the basin, being officially named on January 23. It impacted Madagascar and a number of other Southern African countries with heavy rain. Ana was responsible for a total of 142 deaths. Following Ana, Cyclone Batsirai later formed becoming the second named storm in the basin. Batsirai then intensified into a high-end Intense Tropical Cyclone, or on the Saffir-Simpson Scale, a Category 4 tropical cyclone, becoming the first major tropical cyclone of the year as it passed Mauritius and Réunion. It then made landfall on Madagascar bringing heavy effects and disturbing power on the country and became the strongest storm for the month of January. The Southern Hemisphere also saw the formation of seven tropical lows, however most of them never affected any landmass.

Tropical cyclones formed in January 2022
Storm name	Dates active	Max wind km/h (mph)	Pressure (hPa)	Areas affected	Damage (USD)	Deaths	Ref(s)
Cody	January 5–13	130 (80)	971	Fiji	$12.9 million	1	
Tiffany	January 8–17	100 (65)	988	Queensland, Northern Territory	$36,000	7	
Humberto	January 12–14	100 (65)	1000	None	None	None	
11U	January 13–14	Unknown	1008	None	None	None	
04F	January 15–18	Unknown	999	Cook Islands	None	None	
05F	January 19–22	Unknown	999	None	None	None	
Ana	January 20–25	85 (50)	990	Madagascar, Mozambique, South Africa, Malawi, Zimbabwe, Zambia	$25 million	142	
TL	January 22–25	Unknown	1005	None	None	None	
Batsirai	January 24 – February 8	205 (125)	923	Mauritius, Réunion, Madagascar	$200 million	123	
06F	January 28–30	Unknown	1001	New Caledonia	None	None	
07F	January 29 – February 7	65 (40)	995	New Caledonia	None	None	
14U	January 30 – February 6	Unknown	1003	Western Australia	None	None	

=== February ===
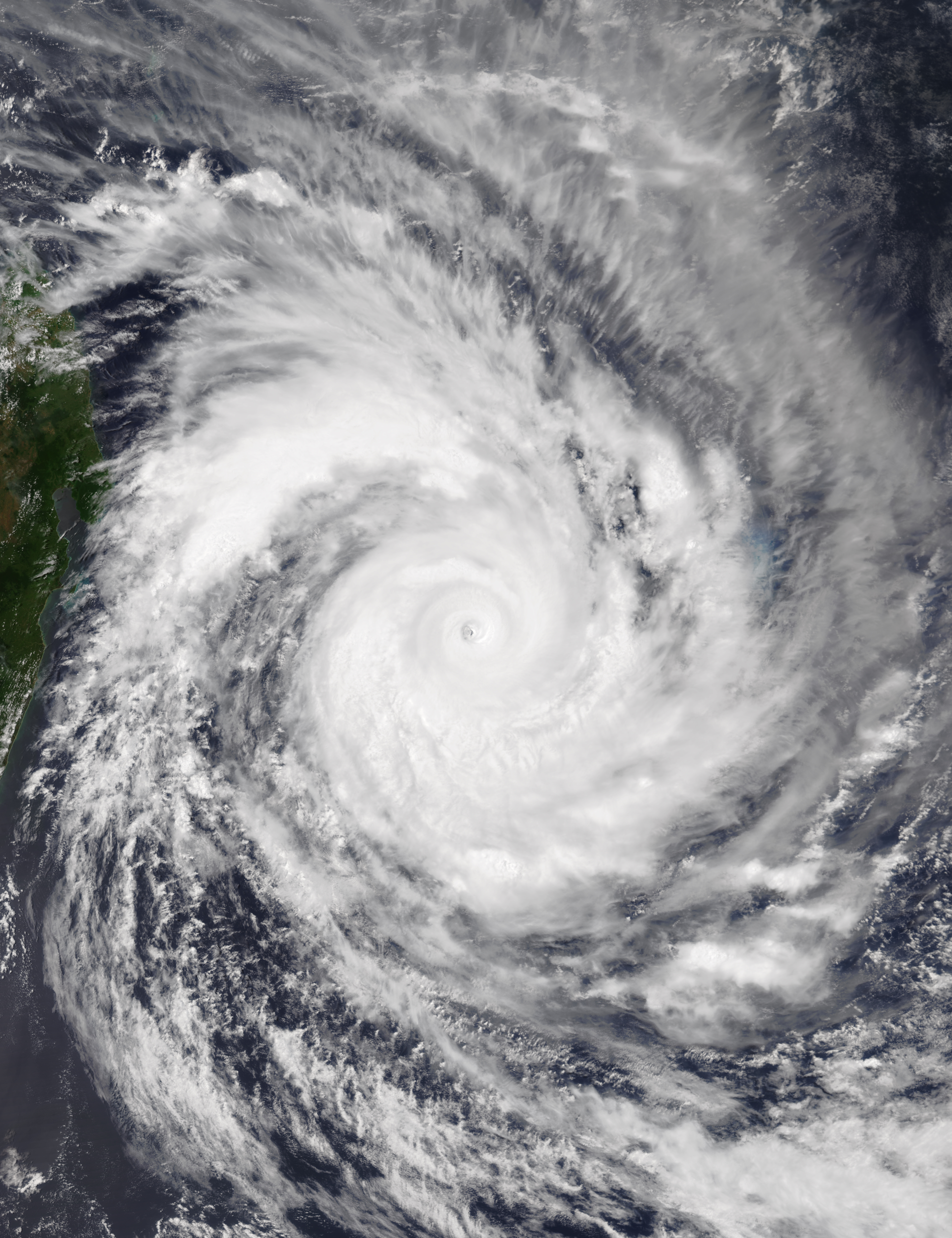
Cyclone Emnati

February was extremely active, featuring fifteen systems, with eight of them being named, the highest on record. The month started off with Tropical Storm Cliff which formed in the South-West Indian Ocean. Moreover, in the basin, Tropical Storm Dumako and Cyclone Emnati both made landfall on Madagascar, which was already devastated by Cyclone Batsirai a month prior. Additionally, Fezile entered the basin from the Australian basin. However, Fezile struggled to keep its structure due to wind shear and dissipated a few days later. The South Pacific basin saw the formation of Severe Tropical Cyclone Dovi along with a tropical disturbance classified as 07F, and Eva. Dovi intensified into a Category 4 cyclone on the Australian scale before making landfall on New Zealand as an extratropical storm. Dovi caused minor damage on the country along with Vanuatu and New Caledonia. Eva formed west of Vanuatu. The system made landfall in New Caledonia before it intensified into a Category 1 cyclone. Eva began to weaken on March 4 as a Subtropical Depression and dissipated in a day later. Both Cyclones Dovi and Emnati became the strongest storm for the month of February. In the Australian region, Cyclones Vernon and Anika developed near the end of the month. Anika made landfall in Kimberley, while Vernon stayed away from any landmass.

Tropical cyclones formed in February 2022
Storm name	Dates active	Max wind km/h (mph)	Pressure (hPa)	Areas affected	Damage (USD)	Deaths	Ref(s)
Cliff	February 3–5	75 (45)	994	None	None	None	
17U	February 5–14	Unknown	1001	None	None		
Dovi	February 6–12	175 (110)	940	Vanuatu, New Caledonia, Norfolk Island, New Zealand	$84 million	None	
Dumako	February 10–18	85 (50)	993	Madagascar, Mozambique	None	None	
Fezile	February 13–18	75 (45)	980	None	$54.4 million	15	
Emnati	February 15–24	175 (110)	935	Mauritius, Réunion, Madagascar	$1 million	15	
20U	February 17–19	Unknown	1003	None	None		
Vernon	February 23 – March 3	195 (120)	950	None	None	None	
08	February 23–27	75 (45)	992	None	None	None	
21U	February 24 – March 1	Unknown	1001	North Queensland	None		
Anika	February 24 – March 3	95 (60)	987	Northern Territory, Western Australia	None	None	
Eva	February 26 – March 5	65 (40)	995	Vanuatu, New Caledonia	None	None	
26U	February 27 – March 4	65 (40)	1004	None	None		

=== March ===
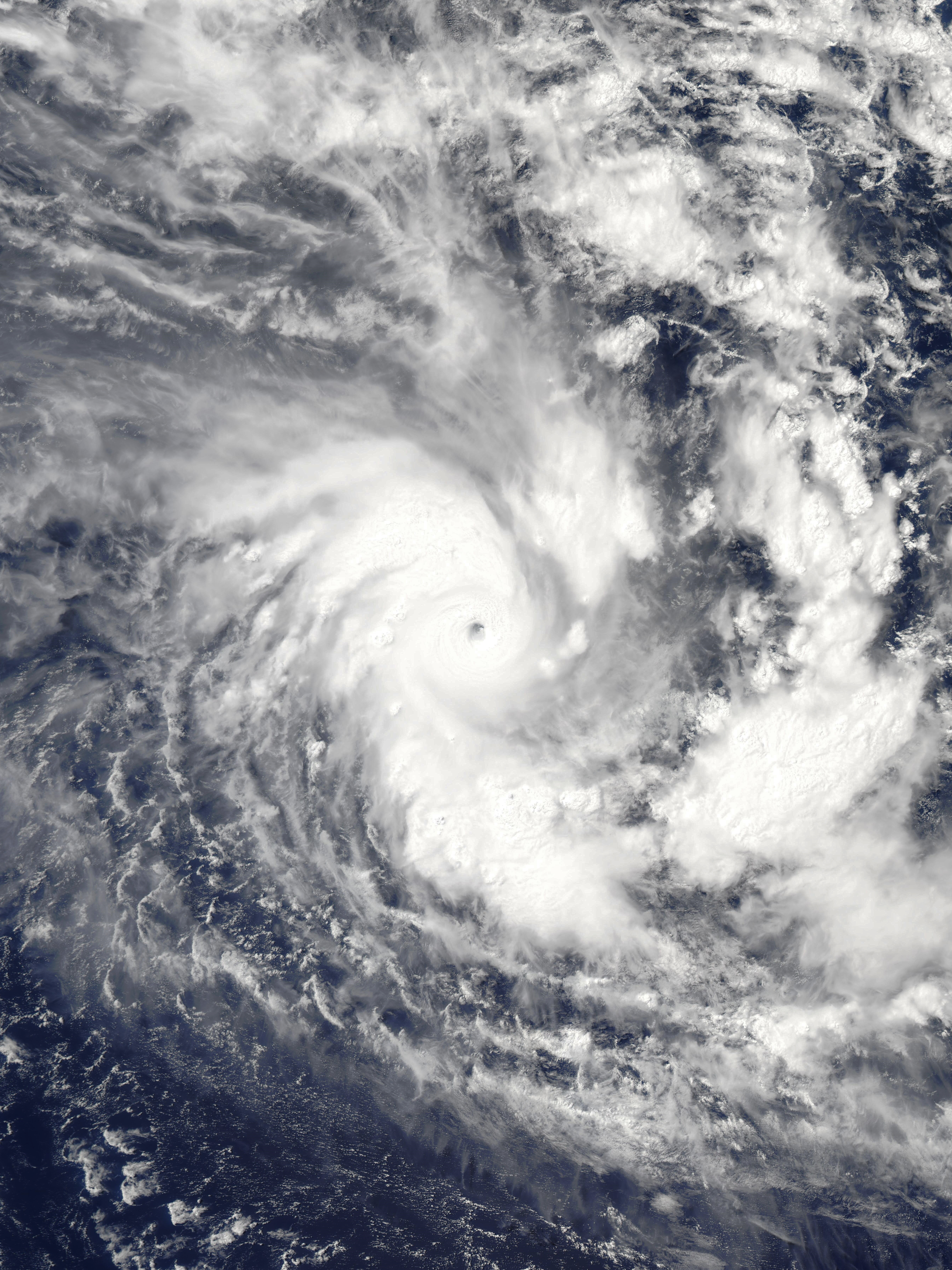
Cyclone Halima

March was slightly below-average, featuring eight systems, with four of them being named. On March 3, Depression BOB 01 started off the 2022 North Indian Ocean cyclone season unusually early when it formed in the Bay of Bengal and is only the ninth such system to form in the month of March since reliable records began in 1891. BOB 01 was also the first tropical cyclone to form in the Northern Hemisphere in 2022. Similarly, BOB 02 also formed on March 20, becoming the only season in the Indian Ocean basin to witness two systems in the month of March. In the Australian region, Tropical Cyclone Billy formed on March 11, but remained out to sea and dissipated on March 17, as well as Cyclone Charlotte form on March 15, which rapidly intensified into a Category 2-equivalent cyclone before weakening and dissipating eleven days later. A tropical low formed near Christmas Island at the end of the month. In the South-West Indian Ocean, Cyclone Gombe formed on March 5 and impacted Madagascar, Mozambique, Malawi and dissipated on March 17, killing 72 people in those nations. The South-West Indian Ocean saw its fifth Intense Tropical Cyclone of the year when Cyclone Halima also rapidly intensified into a Category 4-equivalent storm. Halima became the strongest storm for the month of March. The Western Pacific Ocean typhoon season began on March 29, with the formation of a tropical depression southeast of Da Nang, Vietnam which received the designation 01W by the JTWC. The system made landfall in Vietnam before it dissipated the next day.

Tropical cyclones formed in March 2022
Storm name	Dates active	Max wind km/h (mph)	Pressure (hPa)	Areas affected	Damage (USD)	Deaths	Ref(s)
BOB 01	March 3–6	55 (35)	1002	Sri Lanka	None	None	
Gombe	March 5–17	165 (105)	960	Madagascar, Mozambique, Malawi	$99 million	72	
Billy	March 12–17	95 (60)	988	None	None	None	
Charlotte	March 15–26	165 (105)	956	Lesser Sunda Islands	None	None	
BOB 02	March 20–23	55 (35)	1000	Andaman and Nicobar Islands, Myanmar	None	None	
Halima	March 20 – April 1	195 (120)	939	None	None	None	
01W	March 29–31	55 (35)	1006	Vietnam	$149 million	6	
30U	March 30 – April 1	45 (30)	1004	None	None	None	

=== April ===
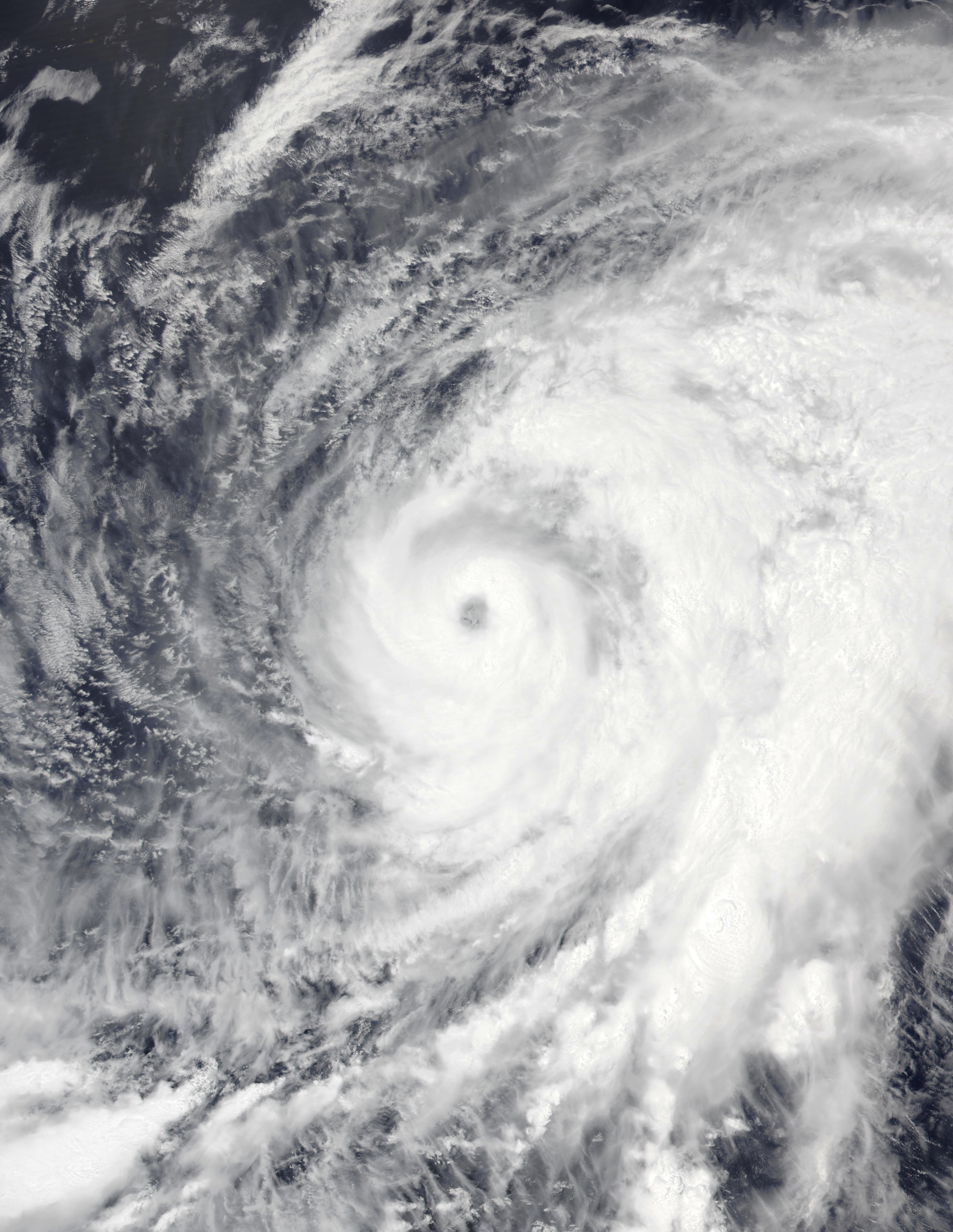
Typhoon Malakas

April was above-average, featured nine systems, with five of them being named. On April 3, Tropical Cyclone Fili formed in the Coral Sea. It approached the island of New Caledonia before weakening. The Western Pacific Ocean basin saw the formation of Typhoon Malakas which made it the first named storm in the basin. Malakas formed near the Caroline Islands before slowly strengthening into typhoon three days later. On the same day, Malakas entered the PAR, which was then named Basyang by the PAGASA. Malakas reached its peak intensity as a Category 4 typhoon and became the strongest storm for the month of April. Malakas affected the Bonin Islands before accelerating north-eastward towards Japan and transitioned into an extratropical cyclone by April 15. A few days later, a tropical depression formed near Palau. The storm was named Megi by the JMA and classified as Agaton by the PAGASA. Despite its short duration, Megi devastated much of the Eastern Visayas Region which was already struck by Typhoon Rai four months prior. Megi moved very slowly during most of its lifespan and dissipated on April 12 due to its interaction with Malakas. In the Australian region, two short lived tropical lows (32U and 33U) formed but dissipated without reaching any landmass. Additionally, 34U formed near Christmas Island on April 23. However, it did not pose a threat to any habitable areas so far and dissipated six days later. In the South-West Indian Ocean, an unusual subtropical depression formed off the coast of South Africa on April 12, which was named Issa by the MFR. The storm exacerbated ongoing flooding in KwaZulu-Natal. Eight days later, Severe Tropical Storm Jasmine formed near the Comoros. Jasmine first affected the Mozambique coast before it eventually made landfall in Toliara before weakening.

Tropical cyclones formed in April 2022
Storm name	Dates active	Max wind km/h (mph)	Pressure (hPa)	Areas affected	Damage (USD)	Deaths	Ref(s)
Fili	April 3–9	110 (70)	977	New Caledonia	None	None	
Malakas (Basyang)	April 6–15	165 (105)	945	Guam, Caroline Islands, Bonin Islands	None	None	
Megi (Agaton)	April 8–12	75 (45)	996	Philippines	$200 million	214	
32U	April 8–9	Unknown	Unknown	None	None	None	
Issa	April 12–13	95 (60)	994	South Africa	None	None	
33U	April 16–19	45 (30)	1005	Northern Territory	None	None	
Jasmine	April 21–27	110 (70)	982	Comoros, Mozambique, Madagascar	$1 million	10	
34U	April 25–29	65 (40)	998	None	None	None	
37U	April 25–26	65 (40)	996	None	None	None	

=== May ===
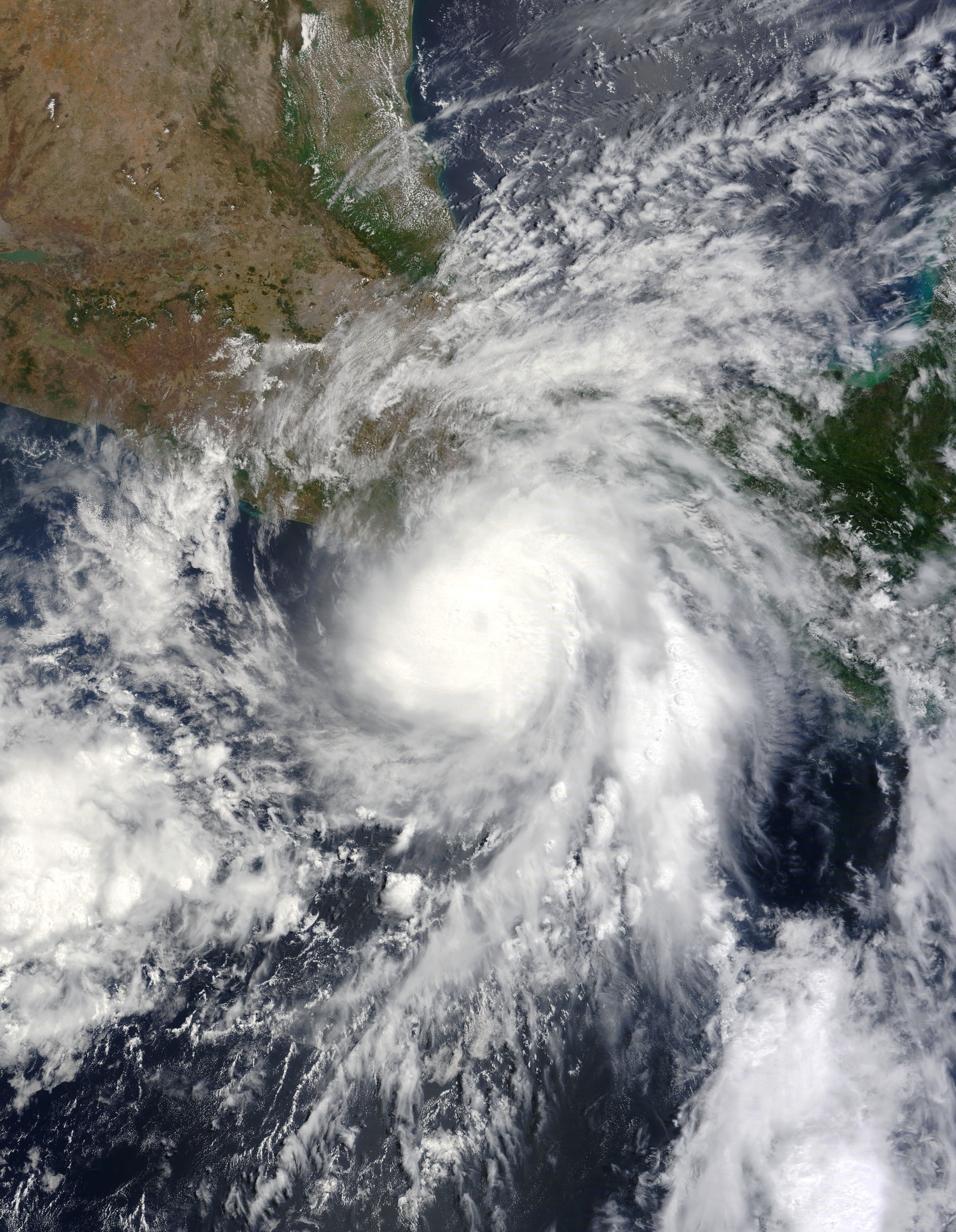
Hurricane Agatha

May was well above average, featuring eight systems, with five of them being named. The month started off with a westerly wind burst occurring in the Indian Ocean which resulted in the formation of Karim in the Australian region and Asani in the Northern Indian Ocean basin. Karim reached its peak intensity as a Category 2 cyclone before dissipating without affecting any landmass. Asani on the other hand, rapidly formed off the coast of Andaman and Nicobar Islands before intensifying into the basin's first cyclone. As it approached the coast of India, Asani began to stall and started losing its strength due to severe wind shear and dry air. Asani eventually made landfall near Machilipatnam as a weak tropical storm and dissipated the next day. It became the first pre-monsoon cyclone to affect Southern India since 2010. Moreover, another depression classified as BOB 04 formed over the Gulf of Martaban. The system made landfall over the southern Burmese coast and dissipated on the same day. In the South Pacific, an off-season cyclone named Gina formed northeast of Vanuatu. Gina reached its peak as a Category 1 cyclone before dissipating. Gina caused minor flooding and damage to Vanuatu. In the South Atlantic, a subtropical storm named Yakecan formed off the coast of southern Brazil. Yakecan killed two people in total and was the last name used by the Brazilian Navy. On May 28, Agatha which became the first storm in the Eastern Pacific basin, formed southwest of Mexico and made landfall on Oaxaca, Mexico on May 30 as a Category 2 hurricane. Agatha became the strongest storm during the month. In the Australian region, another off-season tropical low formed near Christmas Island according to the BoM. In the Western Pacific basin, a tropical depression formed northeast of Mindanao after a month of inactivity. The depression dissipated on the same day.

Tropical cyclones formed in May 2022
Storm name	Dates active	Max wind km/h (mph)	Pressure (hPa)	Areas affected	Damage (USD)	Deaths	Ref(s)
Karim	May 5–11	110 (70)	982	None	None	None	
Asani	May 7–12	100 (65)	982	Andaman and Nicobar Islands, Andhra Pradesh, Tamil Nadu, Karnataka, Odisha	$323 million	3	
Gina	May 16–21	75 (45)	998	Vanuatu	None	None	
Yakecan	May 17–19	95 (60)	990	Brazil, Uruguay	$50 million	2	
BOB 04	May 20–21	45 (30)	996	Myanmar, Thailand	None	None	
Agatha	May 28–31	175 (110)	964	Southern Mexico	$327 million	9	
TL	May 28–31	Unknown	1004	Christmas Island, Western Australia	None	None	
TD	May 30	Unknown	1006	Philippines	None	None	

=== June ===
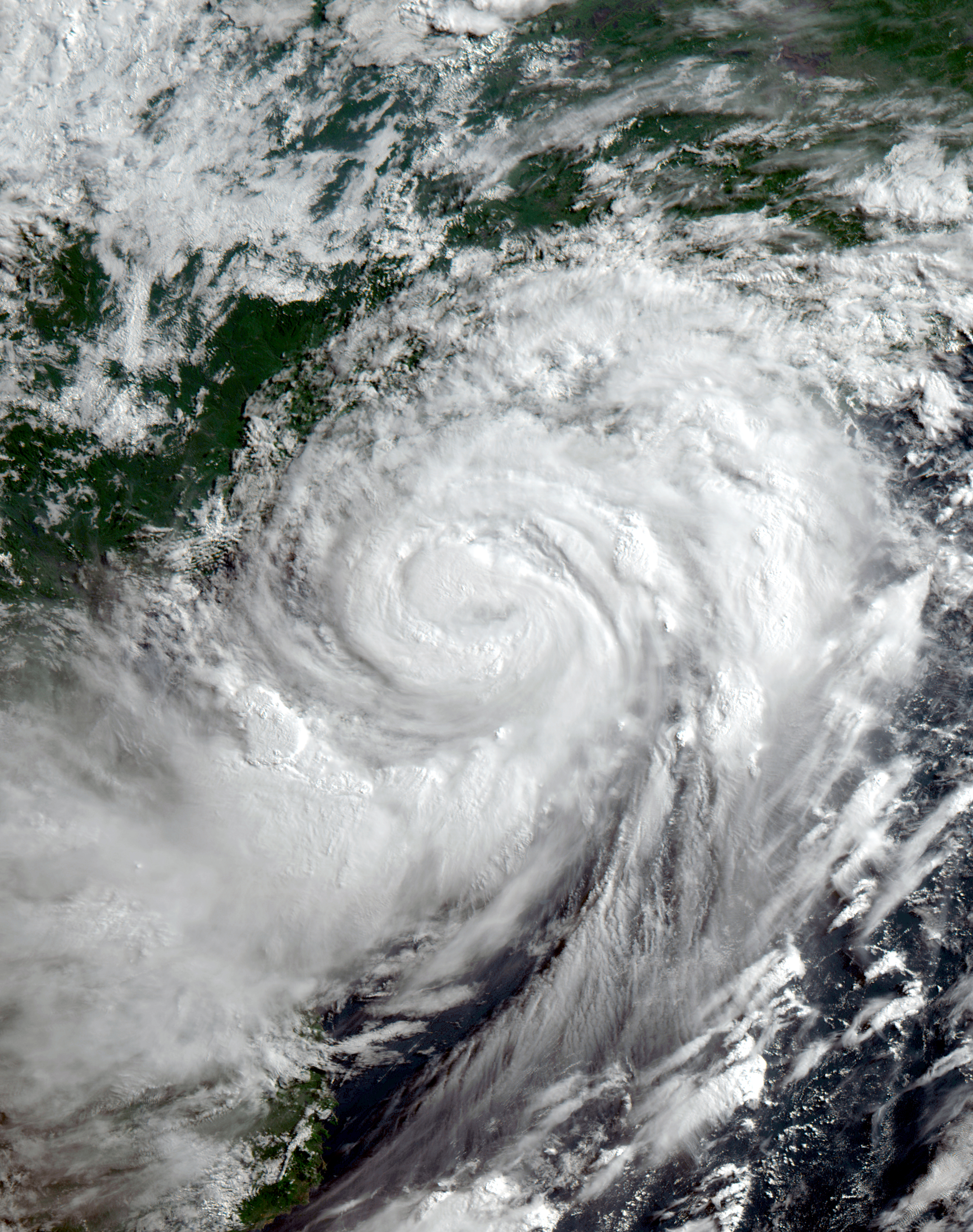
Typhoon Chaba

June was fairly inactive featuring only five systems, with all of them being named. The month started off with a tropical storm named Alex which formed in the Atlantic near Florida and The Bahamas, becoming the first storm in the basin this year. The precursor of Alex killed four people in Cuba due to flooding. In the Eastern Pacific Ocean, Blas formed off the coast of southwestern Mexico. Blas intensified into the basin's second hurricane where it was responsible for four deaths in Mexico. Two days later, Celia formed off the coast of Central America. Celia reached its peak intensity as a tropical storm and struggled to intensify further due to a mid-level ridge. One death has been attributed to Celia in Oaxaca where a man drowned. In the Western Pacific basin after a month of inactivity, Chaba formed west of Luzon and reached its peak intensity as a Category 1 typhoon, later becoming the strongest storm for the month of June. Chaba then made landfall on Maoming in South China and dissipated over Central China. Chaba killed at least 12 people when a crane vessel sunk off the coast of Hong Kong. Additionally by the end of the month, Aere formed in the Philippine Sea south of Okinawa. Aere then made landfall on Okinawa before weakening into a tropical depression as it headed towards Japan.

Tropical cyclones formed in June 2022
Storm name	Dates active	Max wind km/h (mph)	Pressure (hPa)	Areas affected	Damage (USD)	Deaths	Ref(s)
Alex	June 5–6	110 (70)	984	Yucatán Peninsula, Cuba, Florida, The Bahamas, Bermuda	$408 million	4	
Blas	June 14–19	140 (85)	978	Southwestern Mexico, Revillagigedo Islands	Minimal	4	
Celia	June 16–28	95 (60)	997	Central America, Revillagigedo Islands	Minimal	1	
Chaba (Caloy)	June 28 – July 5	130 (80)	965	China, Vietnam	$464 million	12	
Aere (Domeng)	June 30 – July 4	85 (50)	994	Japan	Unknown	None	

=== July ===
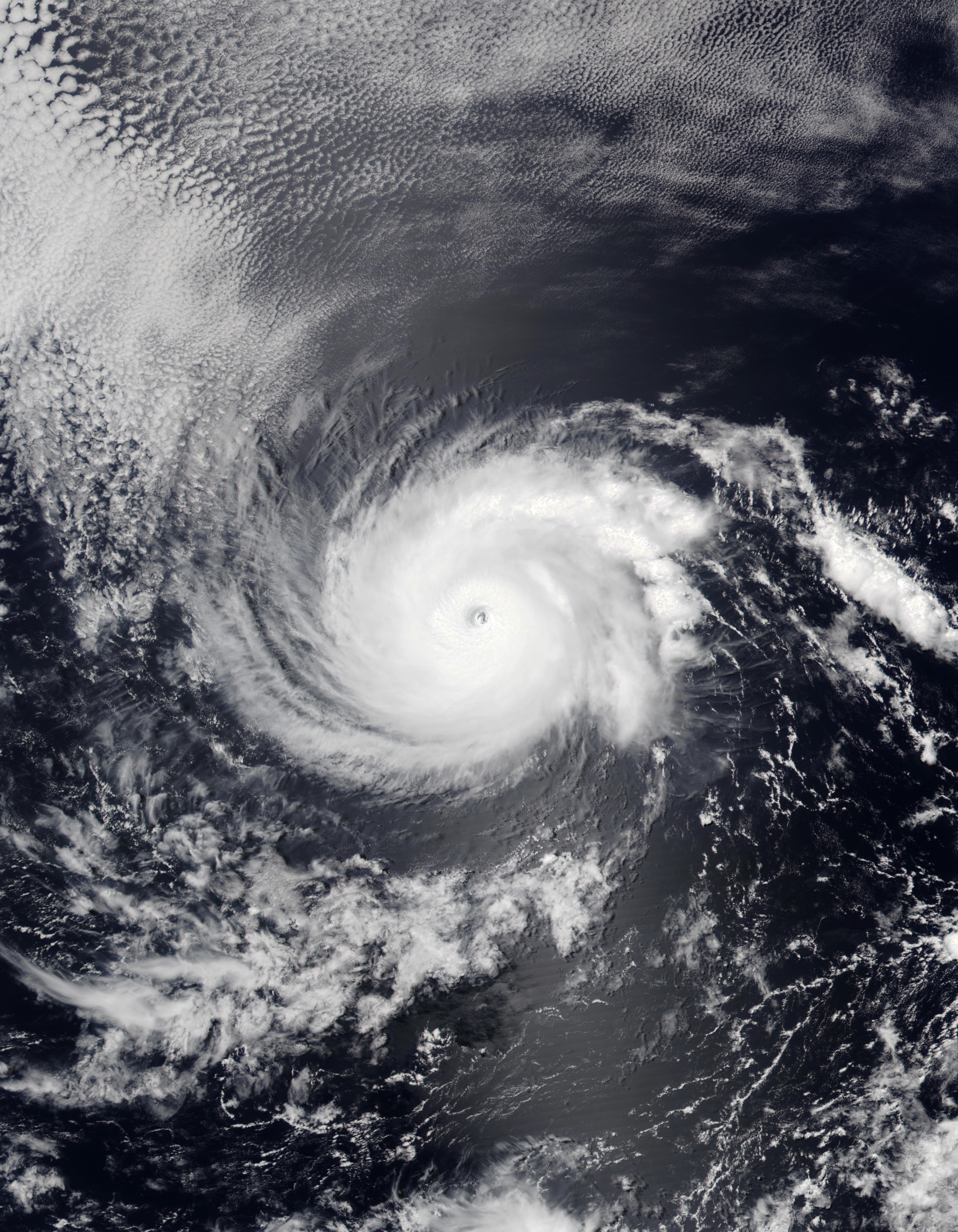
Hurricane Darby

July was average, featuring eleven tropical storms, with eight of them being named. The Atlantic basin featured, Bonnie which formed off the Caribbean coast of Central America on July 1 and made landfall near the Costa Rica–Nicaragua border on the next day. Bonnie then crossed over into the Eastern Pacific basin and intensified into a Category 3 hurricane which became the basin's first major hurricane. Bonnie dissipated on July 9 near the Central Pacific basin. On the next day, Colin formed unexpectedly inland over coastal South Carolina on July 2 and dissipated on the next day over North Carolina. In the Eastern Pacific, Tropical Storm Georgette as well as Hurricanes Darby, Estelle, and Frank formed. Darby reached its peak intensity as a Category 4 hurricane southeast of the Hawaiian Islands and became the strongest storm of the month. Georgette, Estelle, and Frank stayed at sea and were not a major threat to land. The Western Pacific basin featured a short lived tropical depression and Tropical Storms Songda and Trases. Songda formed northwest of the Mariana Islands and passed south of Japan, while Trases formed north of Okinawa. The North Indian Ocean featured a short lived depression classified as ARB 01 which become the first monsoon depression in the basin. Additionally, a tropical cyclone classified as 01U formed in the Australian region, starting the 2022–23 Australian region cyclone season unusually early.

Tropical cyclones formed in July 2022
Storm name	Dates active	Max wind km/h (mph)	Pressure (hPa)	Areas affected	Damage (USD)	Deaths	Ref(s)
Bonnie	July 1–9	185 (115)	964	Trinidad and Tobago, Grenada, Venezuela, ABC Islands, Colombia, Costa Rica, Nicaragua, Guatemala, El Salvador, Southwestern Mexico, Revillagigedo Islands	$25 million	5	
Colin	July 2–3	65 (40)	1011	The Carolinas	Minimal	1	
Darby	July 9–17	220 (140)	953	Hawaii	None	None	
Estelle	July 15–21	140 (85)	985	Southwestern Mexico, Revillagigedo Islands	None	None	
ARB 01	July 16–18	45 (30)	992	Gujarat	None	None	
TD	July 24–25	55 (35)	1006	None	None	None	
Frank	July 26 – August 2	150 (90)	976	None	None	None	
Songda	July 26 – August 1	75 (45)	996	Japan, South Korea, North Korea	None	None	
Georgette	July 27 – August 3	95 (60)	997	None	None	None	
01U	July 26–31	85 (50)	994	Cocos (Keeling) Islands	None	None	
Trases (Ester)	July 29 – August 1	65 (40)	998	Ryukyu Islands, South Korea	None	None	

=== August ===
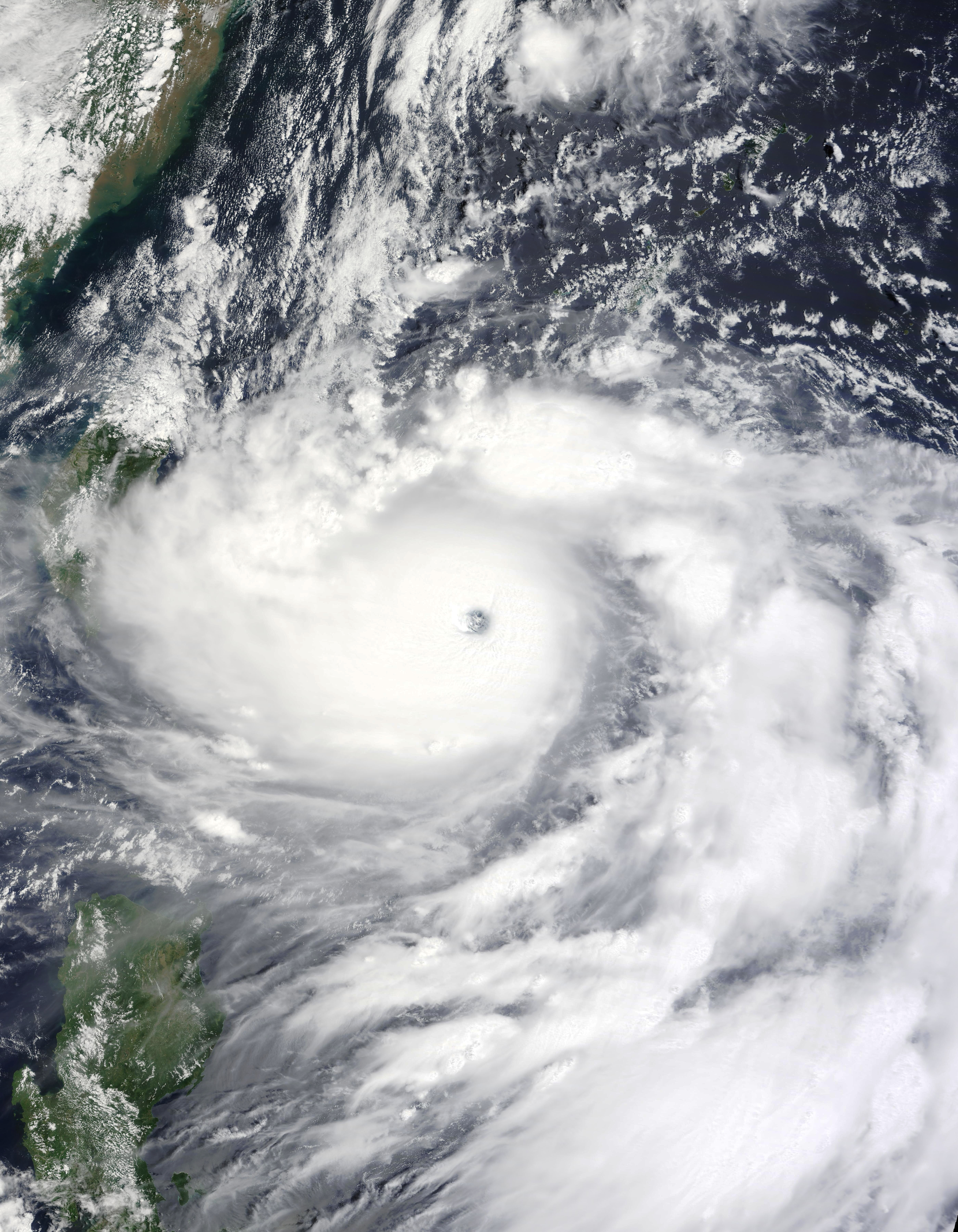
Typhoon Hinnamnor

August was near-average, featuring fifteen tropical storms, with seven of them being named. No cyclones formed in the Atlantic basin during the month. The Eastern Pacific basin featured two named systems, Howard and Ivette. Howard formed southwest off the Mexican coast and reached its peak intensity as a Category 1 hurricane before dissipating. Ivette formed soon thereafter and struggled to intensify despite being over warm waters, only briefly intensifying into a tropical storm as a result of an unexpected burst of convection. The Western Pacific basin featured four depressions with one being classified as 08W and the other as Gardo. Additionally, Tropical Storms Mulan, Meari, and Ma-on, as well as Typhoons Tokage and Hinnamnor formed. Hinnamnor was the strongest system during the month, peaking as the first Category 5 tropical cyclone of the year globally on August 30. Hinnamnor caused widespread damage across South Korea and Japan during its lifespan. Mulan and Ma-on both affected the Philippines and parts of Southern China and Northern Vietnam. Meari also made landfall on Japan disturbing events held in the country. Tokage on the other hand, passed east of Japan without causing any damage. The Northern Indian Ocean featured four depressions with one forming in the Arabian Sea and the rest in the Bay of Bengal. Notably, BOB 06 and BOB 07 both maintained its structure over India due to the brown ocean effect. BOB 07's remnants later entered Pakistan worsening the ongoing flooding in the country.

Tropical cyclones formed in August 2022
Storm name	Dates active	Max wind km/h (mph)	Pressure (hPa)	Areas affected	Damage (USD)	Deaths	Ref(s)
08W	August 3–4	Unknown	1002	South China, Vietnam	Unknown	None	
Howard	August 6–11	140 (85)	983	Revillagigedo Islands	None	None	
Mulan	August 8–11	65 (40)	996	South China, Vietnam, Laos, Thailand, Myanmar	$1.43 million	7	
LAND 01	August 9–10	45 (30)	992	Central India, Odisha	None	None	
Meari	August 10–14	75 (45)	996	Japan	None	None	
ARB 02	August 12–13	45 (30)	992	Gujarat, Oman	None	None	
Ivette	August 13–16	65 (40)	1005	Revillagigedo Islands	None	None	
BOB 05	August 14–17	45 (30)	993	Central India, Rajasthan, Odisha, West Bengal	None	None	
TD	August 14–15	Unknown	1012	None	None	None	
BOB 06	August 18–23	55 (35)	988	Bangladesh, West Bengal, Odisha, Jharkhand, Central India, Uttar Pradesh	$15.8 million	32	
Ma-on (Florita)	August 20–26	100 (65)	985	Philippines, South China, Vietnam	$66.6 million	7	
Tokage	August 21–25	140 (85)	970	None	None	None	
TD	August 22	55 (35)	1008	None	None	None	
Hinnamnor (Henry)	August 27 – September 6	195 (120)	920	Japan, Philippines, Taiwan, Eastern China, South Korea, North Korea, Russian Far East	$1.81 billion	20	
13W (Gardo)	August 30 – September 1	55 (35)	998	None	None	None	

=== September ===
September was very active—becoming a generally-above average month, featuring twenty-three systems, with twenty of them being named. In the North Atlantic, Tropical Storms Gaston and Hermine as well as Hurricanes Danielle, Earl, Fiona, and Ian and a depression classified as Eleven formed after a 60-day lull in activity within the basin. Danielle became the latest first Atlantic hurricane to develop since 2013. Fiona and Ian were also the most notable hurricanes with Fiona being the most powerful cyclone to strike Canada after causing severe damage across the Caribbean. Ian on the other hand, also caused heavy damage across Cuba and later made landfall in Florida as a Category 4 hurricane. The Eastern Pacific basin featured Tropical Storms Javier, Lester, Madeline, Newton, as well as Hurricanes Kay and Orlene. Javier and Kay followed a generally northwestward path offshore from southwestern Mexico and the Baja California peninsula while Lester made landfall along the coast of Mexico. The Western Pacific basin saw the formations of Tropical Storms Talas and Kulap, Typhoons Muifa, Merbok, Nanmadol, Noru, and Roke and a short lived depression. Muifa peaked as a Category 4 typhoon before it made landfall near Shanghai in China, becoming the strongest typhoon to strike the city on record. Nanmadol, which was the strongest storm of the month and so far worldwide also peaked as a near-Category 5 equivalent typhoon and struck Japan. Merbok, on the other hand, stayed at sea while tropical; however, its remnants later brought hurricane-force winds to several parts of Alaska. The Northern Indian Ocean basin featured a short lived depression classified as BOB 08. The South-West Indian Ocean basin also began with the formation of Ashley on September 25.

Tropical cyclones formed in September 2022
Storm name	Dates active	Max wind km/h (mph)	Pressure (hPa)	Areas affected	Damage (USD)	Deaths	Ref(s)
Danielle	September 1–8	150 (90)	972	Azores, Portugal, Spain	Minimal	None	
Javier	September 1–4	85 (50)	999	Revillagigedo Islands, Baja California Sur	None	None	
Earl	September 3–10	175 (110)	948	Northern Leeward Islands, Puerto Rico, Bermuda, Newfoundland	Unknown	2	
Kay	September 4–10	165 (105)	967	Southwestern Mexico, Revillagigedo Islands, Baja California peninsula, Southern California, Arizona	$63.5 million	3	
Muifa (Inday)	September 5–16	155 (100)	950	Philippines, Taiwan, Yaeyama Islands, East China	$437 million	3	
Merbok	September 9–15	130 (80)	965	Alaska	Unknown	None	
Nanmadol (Josie)	September 9–19	195 (120)	910	Japan, Korean Peninsula, Russian Far East	$1.2 billion	4	
LAND 02	September 11–12	45 (30)	998	Chhattisgarh, Odisha	None	None	
Fiona	September 14–24	220 (140)	931	Northern Leeward Islands, Puerto Rico, Dominican Republic, Eastern Lucayan Archipelago, Bermuda, Atlantic Canada	$6.3 billion	31	
Lester	September 15–17	65 (40)	1005	Southwestern Mexico	Unknown	5	
Madeline	September 16–20	100 (65)	992	Southwestern Mexico	None	3	
Gaston	September 20–26	100 (65)	994	Azores	None	None	
Talas	September 20–23	65 (40)	1000	Japan	None	3	
Noru (Karding)	September 21–29	175 (110)	940	Philippines, Vietnam, Laos, Thailand, Cambodia	$110 million	40	
Newton	September 21–25	100 (65)	996	None	None	None	
Ian	September 23–30	260 (160)	937	Trinidad and Tobago, Venezuela, Colombia, ABC islands, Jamaica, Cayman Islands, Cuba, Florida, Georgia, the Carolinas	$113 billion	161	
Hermine	September 23–26	65 (40)	1003	Senegal, Mauritania, Canary Islands	$9.8 million	None	
Kulap	September 25–29	110 (70)	970	None	None	None	
TD	September 25–26	Unknown	1012	None	None	None	
Ashley	September 26–28	75 (45)	1000	None	None	None	
Roke (Luis)	September 27 – October 1	130 (80)	975	None	None	None	
Eleven	September 28–29	55 (35)	1008	None	None	None	
Orlene	September 29 – October 4	215 (130)	954	Islas Marías, Western Mexico	$600,000	None	

=== October ===
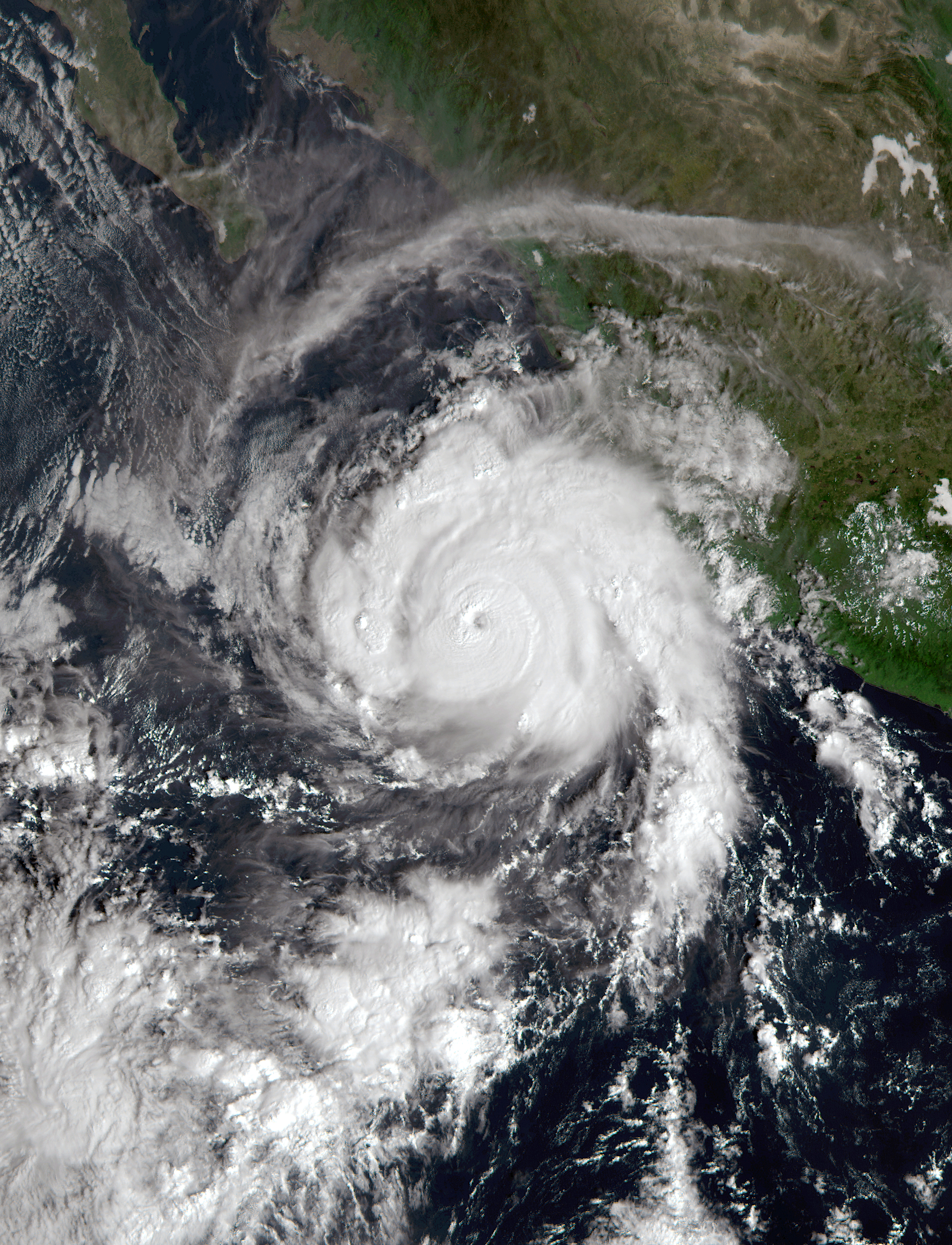
Hurricane Roslyn

October was above average, featuring sixteen tropical storms, with twelve of them being named. The North Atlantic basin featured Tropical Storm Karl, Hurricanes Lisa, Julia, and a depression classified as Twelve. Julia killed at least 91 people across Central America and Venezuela before emerging into the Pacific Ocean; becoming the second storm of the season to survive the crossover, after Bonnie in July. Karl on the other hand, stalled in the Bay of Campeche during its lifespan before dissipating near the Mexican coast. The Eastern Pacific basin featured Tropical Storm Paine and Hurricane Roslyn. Roslyn, which became the strongest storm during the month peaked as a Category 4 hurricane before making landfall on Mexico as a Category 3 hurricane. Roslyn caused moderate damage across the country and became the strongest storm to strike Mexico since Patricia in 2015. Paine on the other hand, never affected any landmass. In the Western Pacific basin, Tropical Storms Sonca, Haitang, Nalgae, Banyan, Typhoon Nesat, along with three short lived depressions formed. Sonca made landfall in Vietnam while Nalgae made multiple landfalls in the Philippines causing heavy flooding. Nesat travelled across the South China Sea, reaching its peak intensity as a Category 2 typhoon before dissipating between Vietnam and Hainan Island. Haitang on the other hand, stayed at sea. The North Indian Ocean basin featured its second named storm since May, Cyclone Sitrang. Sitrang developed in the Bay of Bengal before making landfall on Bangladesh, killing at least 35 people. The South-West Indian Ocean featured Balita, the second named storm in the basin on October 3.

Tropical cyclones formed in October 2022
Storm name	Dates active	Max wind km/h (mph)	Pressure (hPa)	Areas affected	Damage (USD)	Deaths	Ref(s)
Paine	October 3–5	75 (45)	1004	Revillagigedo Islands	None	None	
Balita	October 3–9	65 (40)	996	None	None	None	
Twelve	October 4–7	55 (35)	1006	None	None	None	
Julia	October 7–10	140 (85)	982	Trinidad and Tobago, Venezuela, ABC islands, Colombia, Nicaragua, Honduras, El Salvador, Guatemala, Panama, Mexico	$762 million	91	
Maymay	October 11–12	Unknown	1002	Philippines	$9.16 million	2	
Karl	October 11–15	95 (60)	997	Southern Mexico	$76.9 million	3	
21W	October 12–14	55 (35)	1002	None	None	None	
Sonca	October 13–15	65 (40)	996	Vietnam, Laos, Cambodia	$102 million	10	
Nesat (Neneng)	October 13–20	140 (85)	965	Philippines, Taiwan, South China, Vietnam, Cambodia, Laos	$16.7 million	None	
Ciprian	October 16–20	65 (40)	1006	Greece, Egypt, Cyprus	None	None	
Haitang	October 18–19	65 (40)	1002	None	None	None	
25W (Obet)	October 18–23	55 (35)	1006	Philippines	Minimal	2	
Roslyn	October 20–24	215 (130)	954	Islas Marías, Western Mexico	$49.7 million	4	
Sitrang	October 22–26	85 (50)	995	Andaman and Nicobar Islands, Bangladesh	$105 million	>35	
Nalgae (Paeng)	October 26 – November 3	110 (70)	975	Philippines	$321 million	160	
Banyan (Queenie)	October 28 – November 1	65 (40)	1002	Caroline Islands, Palau	None	None	
Lisa	October 31 – November 5	150 (90)	985	Jamaica, Honduras, Belize, Guatemala, Mexico	$100 million	None	

=== November ===
Hurricane Martin

November was an inactive month, featuring only six storms, with three of them being named. The North Atlantic basin featured two hurricanes named Martin and Nicole. Martin, which became the strongest storm during the month peaked as a Category 1 hurricane in the open Atlantic before it transitioned into a post-tropical cyclone. The storm later approached Ireland as a European windstorm before dissipating. Nicole on the other hand also peaked as a Category 1 hurricane before making a rare landfall over the Bahamas and the eastern coast of Florida. Despite Nicole being relatively weak, its large size inflicted severe damage to many areas including Florida, which was already devastated by Ian six weeks earlier. Additionally, 11 deaths were reported from the hurricane. The Western Pacific basin featured only one system named Yamaneko, which was short-lived and never affected any landmass. The Northern Indian Ocean basin also featured only one depression classified as BOB 08, which made landfall over Southern India before dissipating. In the Southern Hemisphere, two tropical lows classified as 02U and 03U formed in the Australian region with 02U crossing over to the South-West Indian Ocean basin where it was re-classified as 03 before dissipating. 03U paralleled the Indonesian coast before it dissipated north of Australia.

Tropical cyclones formed in November 2022
Storm name	Dates active	Max wind km/h (mph)	Pressure (hPa)	Areas affected	Damage (USD)	Deaths	Ref(s)
Martin	November 1–3	140 (85)	965	None	None	None	
02U (03)	November 1–6	55 (35)	1004	None	None	None	
Nicole	November 7–11	120 (75)	980	Dominican Republic, Puerto Rico, The Bahamas, Southeastern United States	$1 billion	11	
Yamaneko	November 11–14	65 (40)	1004	None	None	None	
03U	November 15–26	Unknown	1005	Christmas Island	None	None	
BOB 08	November 20–24	45 (30)	1005	None	None	None	

=== December ===
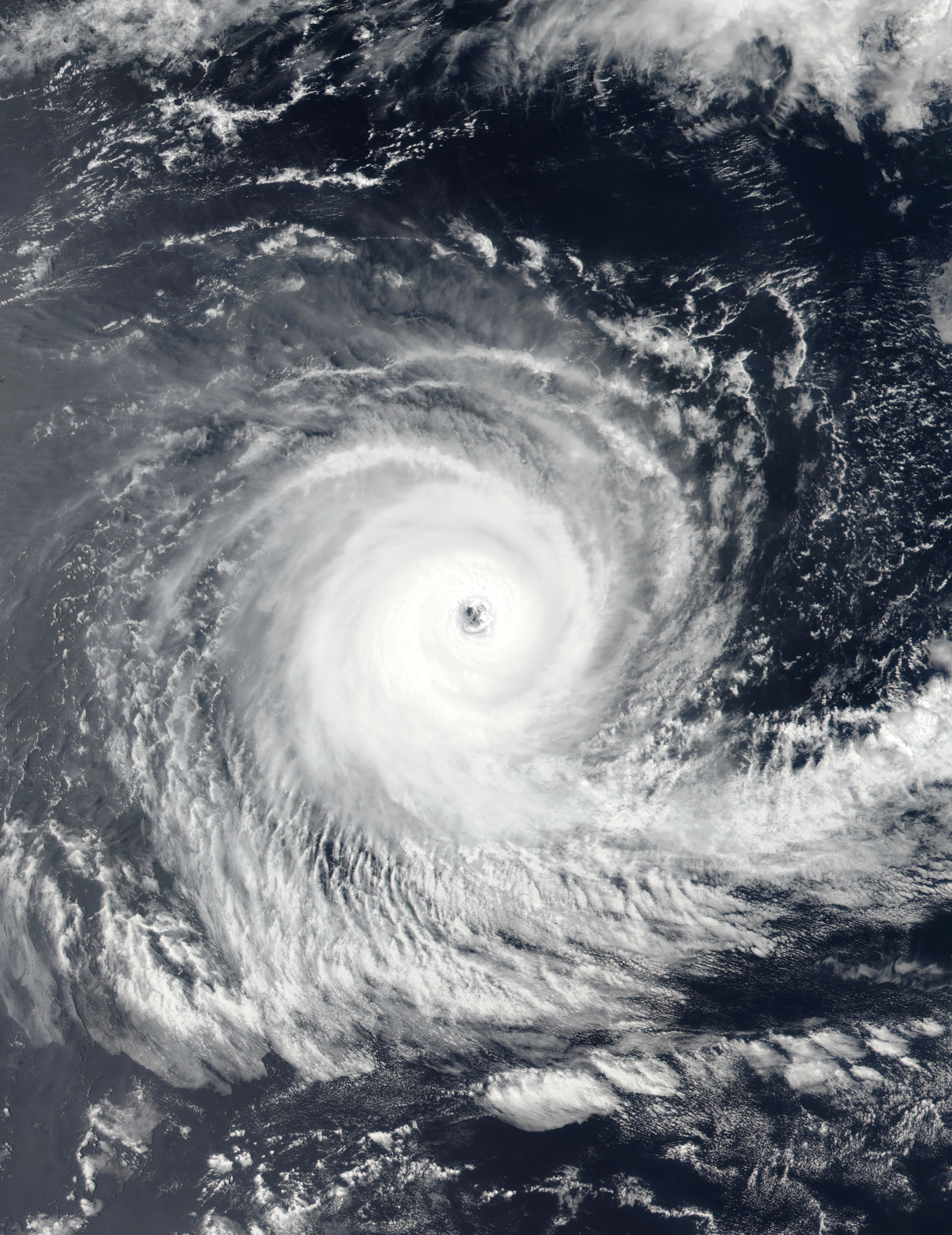
Cyclone Darian

December was fairly inactive, featuring seven storms, with four of them being named. The month started off with the formation of Cyclone Mandous, which formed in the North Indian Ocean. Mandous formed in the Bay of Bengal before making landfall over Southern India. Mandous's remnants later regenerated in the Arabian Sea, where it was reclassified as ARB 03. The depression however failed to strengthen due to wind shear and dissipated south of the Arabian Peninsula. The Western Pacific basin featured only Tropical Storm Pakhar, which passed east of the Philippines and dissipated. Despite the storm not making landfall, the storm dumped heavy rain across the country which killed 8 people in the province of Tanay, Rizal. Back in the Northern Indian Ocean basin, another depression classified as BOB 10 formed in the Bay of Bengal. The depression traveled in many directions during its lifespan and dissipated west of Sri Lanka. In the Southern Hemisphere, Cyclone Darian formed and traveled across the Australian and South Indian Ocean basin as a major cyclone, becoming the first major cyclone of the season for both basins. Additionally, Darian was also the strongest storm during the month. In the Australian basin, Cyclone Ellie formed in the Timor Sea before making landfall over the Northern Territory in Australia. In the Southern Pacific basin, two depressions classified as 01F and 02F formed with none of them causing severe damage.

Tropical cyclones formed in December 2022
Storm name	Dates active	Max wind km/h (mph)	Pressure (hPa)	Areas affected	Damage (USD)	Deaths	Ref(s)
Mandous	December 6–10	95 (60)	990	Andaman and Nicobar Islands, Sri Lanka, Tamil Nadu	$27.4 million	9	
Pakhar (Rosal)	December 10–12	75 (45)	998	Philippines	Unknown	8	
01F	December 10–12	Unknown	1005	Fiji	None	None	
Darian	December 13–30	230 (145)	915	Cocos Islands	None	None	
ARB 03	December 14–17	55 (35)	1000	None	None	None	
Ellie	December 20, 2022 – January 8, 2023	75 (45)	986	Northern Territory, Western Australia	$215 million	None	
BOB 10	December 22–27	45 (30)	1004	Sri Lanka	None	None	
02F	December 29–31	Unknown	999	New Caledonia	None	None	

== Global effects ==
Here are a total of eight tropical cyclone basins, seven are seasonal and one is non-seasonal, thus all seven basins except the South Atlantic are active. In this table, data from all these basins are added.

Season name		Areas affected	Systems formed	Named storms	Hurricanes Typhoons Cyclones	Damage (USD)	Deaths	Ref
North Atlantic Ocean (Note: The wind speeds for this tropical cyclone/basin are based on the Saffir Simpson Scale which uses 1-minute sustained winds.)		ABC Islands, Atlantic Canada, Cayman Islands, Colombia, Costa Rica, Cuba, The Bahamas, Bermuda, Dominican Republic, Grenada, Jamaica, Leeward Islands, Nicaragua, Newfoundland, Puerto Rico, Trinidad and Tobago, Turks and Caicos Islands, South Atlantic United States, Venezuela, Yucatán Peninsula	16	14	9	$117.708 billion	307	
Eastern and Central Pacific Ocean		Arizona, Baja California peninsula, Central America, Costa Rica, El Salvador, Guatemala, Hawaiian Islands, Mexico, Southern Mexico, Nicaragua, Revillagigedo Islands, Southern California	17 (Note: According to the NHC, two tropical storms—Bonnie and Julia—entered into the Eastern Pacific from North Atlantic.)	17	9	$447 million	32	
Western Pacific Ocean (Note: Only systems that formed either before or on December 31, 2022 are counted in the seasonal totals.)		Alaska, Bonin Islands, Cambodia, Caroline Islands, China, Daito Islands, Guam, Japan, Laos, Myanmar North Korea, Philippines, Russian Far East, Ryukyu Islands, South Korea, Taiwan, Thailand, Vietnam, Yaeyama Islands	36	25	13	$5.07 billion	498	
North Indian Ocean (Note: The wind speeds for this tropical cyclone/basin are based on the IMD Scale which uses 3-minute sustained winds.)		India, Andaman and Nicobar Islands, Andhra Pradesh, Chhattisgarh, Gujarat, Karnataka, Tamil Nadu, Odisha, Rajasthan, Uttar Pradesh, Bangladesh, Myanmar, Oman, Sri Lanka, Thailand, Central India, West Bengal, Jharkhand, Meghalaya Assam, Tripura	15	7	3	$471 million	79	
South-West Indian Ocean	January – June (Note: Only systems that formed either on or after January 1, 2022 are counted in the seasonal totals.) (Note: The wind speeds for this tropical cyclone are based on Météo-France, which uses wind gusts.)	Comoros, Madagascar, Malawi, Mauritius, Mozambique, Réunion, South Africa, Zambia, Zimbabwe	13 (Note: According to the BoM, Tropical Cyclone Vernon entered into the South-west Indian Ocean from the Australian region on February 26.)	12	5	$380 million	376	
South-West Indian Ocean	July – December	None	4 (Note: According to the BoM, Severe Tropical Cyclon Darian entered into the South-west Indian Ocean form the Australian region.)	3	1	Unknown	Unknown	
Australian region	January – June	Christmas Island, Northern Territory, Queensland, Solomon Islands, Western Australia	20	5	3	None	2	
Australian region	July – December	Cocos (Keeling) Islands	6	3	1	$215 million	Unknown	
South Pacific Ocean	January – June	Cook Islands, Fiji, New Caledonia, New Zealand, Niue, Norfolk Island, Vanuatu	8	5	1	None	2	
South Pacific Ocean	July – December	Fiji	1	0	0	$96.9 million	2	
South Atlantic Ocean		Brazil, Uruguay	1	1	0	Unknown	2	
Mediterranean Sea		Greece, Cyprus, Egypt	1	1	0	Unknown	0	
Worldwide		(See above)	133 (Note: The sum of the number of systems in each basin will not equal the number shown as the total. This is because when systems move between basins, it creates a discrepancy in the actual number of systems.)	87	40	>$124.291 billion	1,300	

== See also ==
- Weather of 2022
- Tropical cyclones by year
- List of earthquakes in 2022
- Tornadoes in 2022
