= 2021–22 South-West Indian Ocean cyclone season =

Cyclone season in the Southwest Indian Ocean

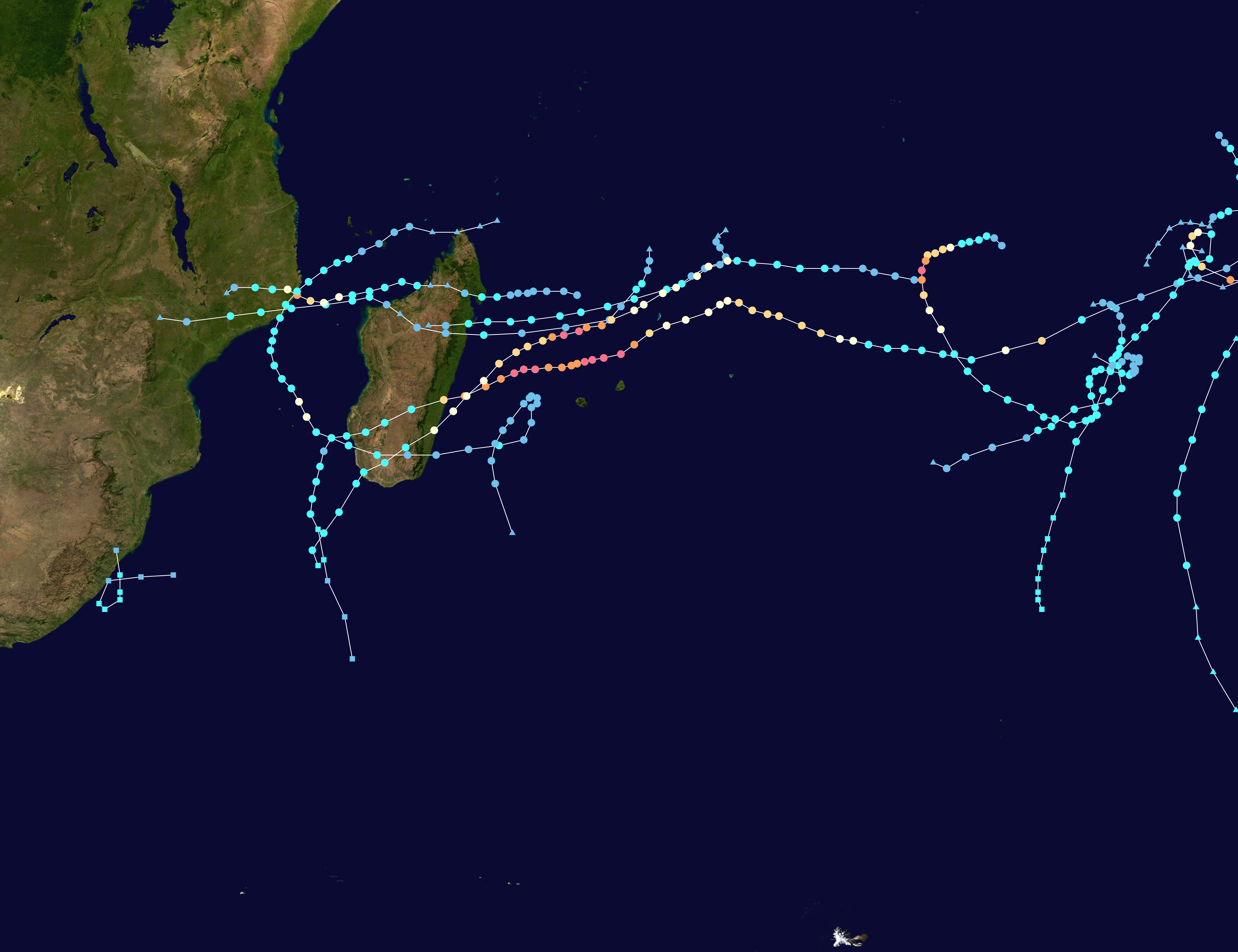
- Season summary map

Seasonal boundaries
- First system formed: 20 January 2022 (record latest)
- Last system dissipated: 7 May 2022

Strongest storm
- Name: Batsirai
  - Maximum winds: 205 km/h (125 mph) (10-minute sustained)
  - Lowest pressure: 923 hPa (mbar)

Seasonal statistics
- Total disturbances: 13
- Total depressions: 13
- Total storms: 12
- Tropical cyclones: 5
- Intense tropical cyclones: 4
- Very intense tropical cyclones: 0
- Total fatalities: 376 total
- Total damage: $380 million (2022 USD)

Related articles
- 2021–22 Australian region cyclone season; 2021–22 South Pacific cyclone season

The 2021–22 South-West Indian Ocean cyclone season had the latest start on record. Despite the late start, it was an above-average season that produced 12 named storms, with five becoming tropical cyclones. The season began on 15 November 2021, and ended on 30 April 2022, with the exception for Mauritius and the Seychelles, for which it ended on 15 May 2022. These dates conventionally delimit the period of each year when most tropical and subtropical cyclones form in the basin, which is west of 90°E and south of the Equator. However, tropical cyclones that form at any time between July 1st, 2021 and June 30th, 2022 will count towards the season total. Tropical and subtropical cyclones in this basin are monitored by the Regional Specialised Meteorological Centre in Réunion and unofficially by the Joint Typhoon Warning Center.

== Seasonal summary ==
Intense Tropical Cyclone Vernon and Tropical Depression 08 interacting with each other by means of the Fujiwhara effect

The season's first storm, Moderate Tropical Storm Ana, formed as a zone of disturbed weather on 20 January 2022, marking the latest first system in a Southwest Indian Ocean cyclone season ever. The second, and strongest storm of the season, Cyclone Batsirai, formed on 24 January, and became a long-lived and powerful storm. It cruised west, and eventually made landfall in Madagascar as a Category 3-equivalent storm. While Batsirai impacted Madagascar, Moderate Tropical Storm Cliff quickly formed but stayed out to sea. Continuing the active period of development, Tropical Storm Dumako formed, struggling to intensify and making landfall in Madagascar later.

Yet another storm, Cyclone Emnati, would strike extreme southern Madagascar as a Category 1-equivalent after peaking as a Category 4-equivalent beforehand. The third Intense Tropical Cyclone, Cyclone Vernon, passed into the basin as a Category 4-equivalent after very rapidly intensifying in the neighboring Australian region. The fourth Intense Tropical Cyclone, Gombe, formed off the coast of Madagascar on 5 March. Initially, the storm struggled to intensify beyond tropical storm status. After hitting Madagascar, Gombe emerged into the Mozambique Channel and rapidly intensified to a Category 3-equivalent cyclone. It then struck Mozambique, bringing heavy rainfall to the same area which Ana had hit a few weeks ago. After Gombe, Halima formed in the northeast of the basin on 21 March. It gradually intensified to an Intense Tropical Cyclone on 25 March, before dissipating later on 1 April. After, Subtropical Depression Issa formed just off the eastern coast of South Africa, an extremely rare phenomenon. It proved itself to be damaging and very deadly, killing hundreds due to catastrophic flooding. Finally, Jasmine formed near Comoros on 21 April before the landfall in Nampula and Zambezia province off the coast of Mozambique and rapidly intensified as Severe Tropical Storm. The storm made landfall in Toliara before it rapidly weakening to an overland depression, and dissipated on 27 April. In early May, Karim formed. Karim did not affect land and entered the Australian region on 7 May.

== Systems ==
=== Severe Tropical Storm Ana ===
- Severe tropical storm (MFR)
- Tropical storm (SSHWS)
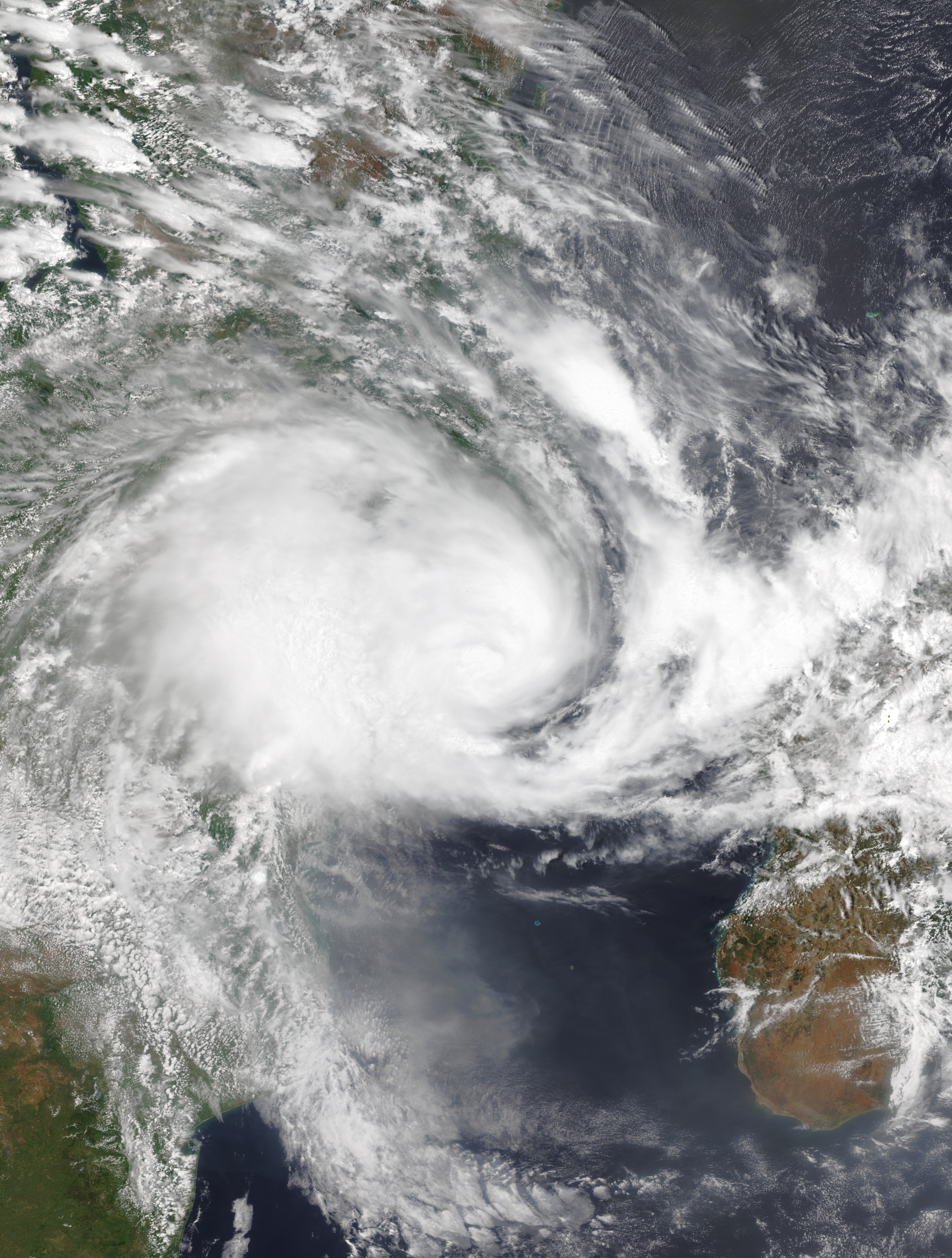
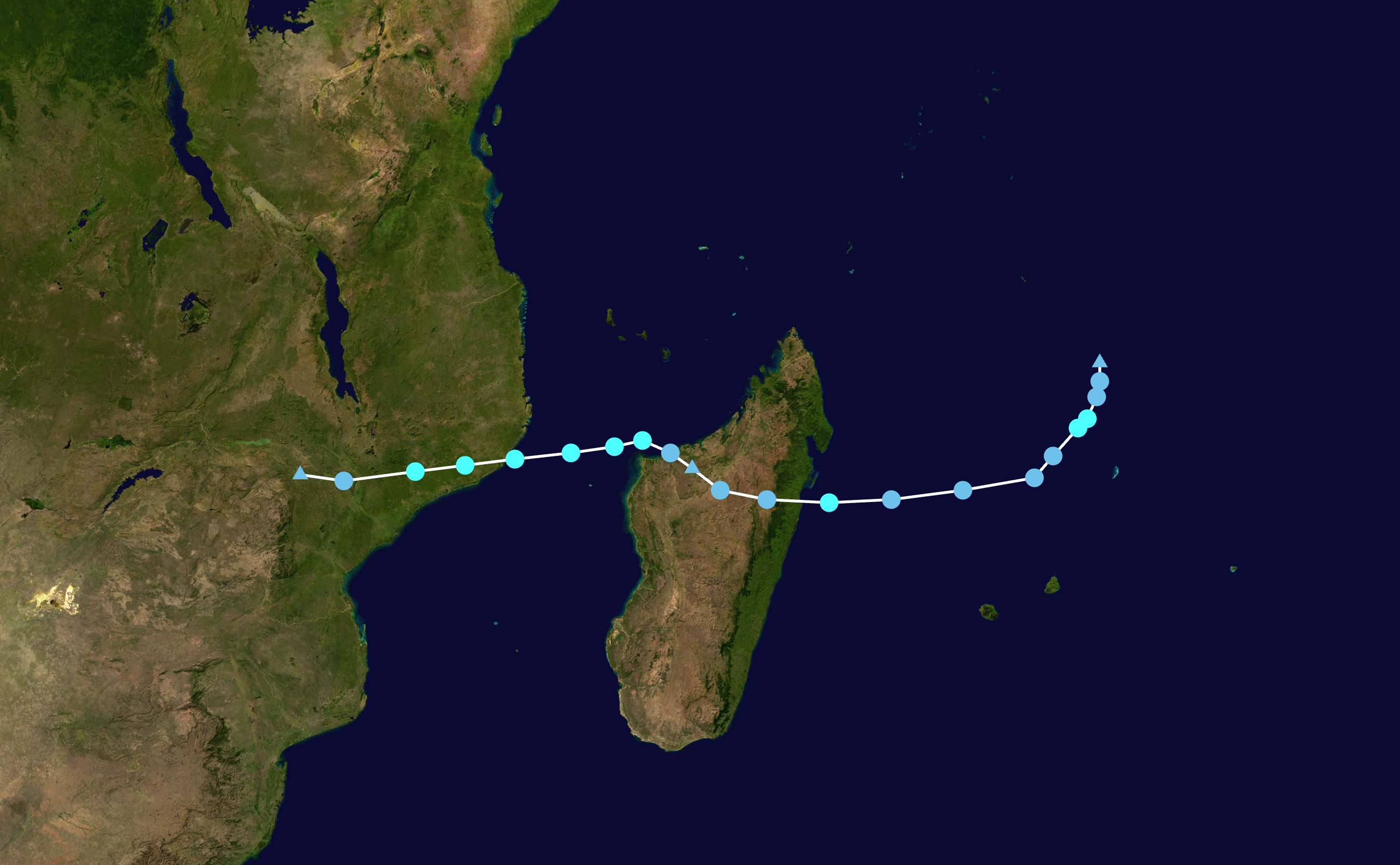
- Duration: 20 January – 25 January
- Peak intensity: 95 km/h (60 mph) (10-min); 987 hPa (mbar)

On 20 January, the Joint Typhoon Warning Center began monitoring an area of convection approximately 378 nmi (700 km; 435 mi) from Mauritius, and gave a low chance for potential tropical cyclogenesis within the next 24 hours. Early the next day, the JTWC issued a Tropical Cyclone Formation Alert (TCFA) for the system, as it consolidated a well-defined low-level circulation center (LLCC). Later at 12:00 UTC, the MFR declared the tropical low pressure system as a zone of disturbed weather, becoming the first system of the season. Twelve hours later, the MFR upgraded it to a tropical disturbance, before further upgrading it to a tropical depression by 06:00 UTC on 22 January. Between 08:00 UTC and 09:00 UTC, the system's center crossed between Toamasina and Île Sainte-Marie as a tropical depression, with the MFR re-classifying the system as an overland depression. Following landfall, the system weakened slightly, though its structure remained intact. By the next day, the MFR re-classified it again as a tropical disturbance after entering the Mozambique Channel. Six hours later, it re-intensified into a tropical depression, as it gradually regained its structure. At 15:00 UTC that same day, the JTWC upgraded the system to a tropical cyclone and designated it 07S. The system later intensified to a moderate tropical storm, with the MFR naming it Ana. It then made landfall in Mozambique, and rapidly weakened, primarily due to friction in land mass.

Despite being a weak system, Ana caused devastating floods in Madagascar, Malawi, and Mozambique, killing 115 people in total. Before becoming a moderate tropical storm, Ana made landfall as a tropical depression in Madagascar, causing heavy rainfall which led to deadly landslides and floods; it caused 58 fatalities in the country. An estimated 55,000 people had become homeless and 130,000 were forced to flee to temporary habitation centres. In Mozambique, at least 20 people had died and 10,000 homes had been destroyed. An additional 20,000 were affected by the cyclone. In Malawi, 200,000 people had been displaced and 37 fatalities had been reported, with additional 22 being missing. Catastrophic flooding caused severe damages to infrastructure and powerlines, which led to severe power outages in the affected areas. The Kapichira hydroelectric dam was badly damaged due to the flash floods. Because of this, the government of Malawi declared a state of natural disaster.

=== Intense Tropical Cyclone Batsirai ===
- Intense tropical cyclone (MFR)
- Category 4 tropical cyclone (SSHWS)
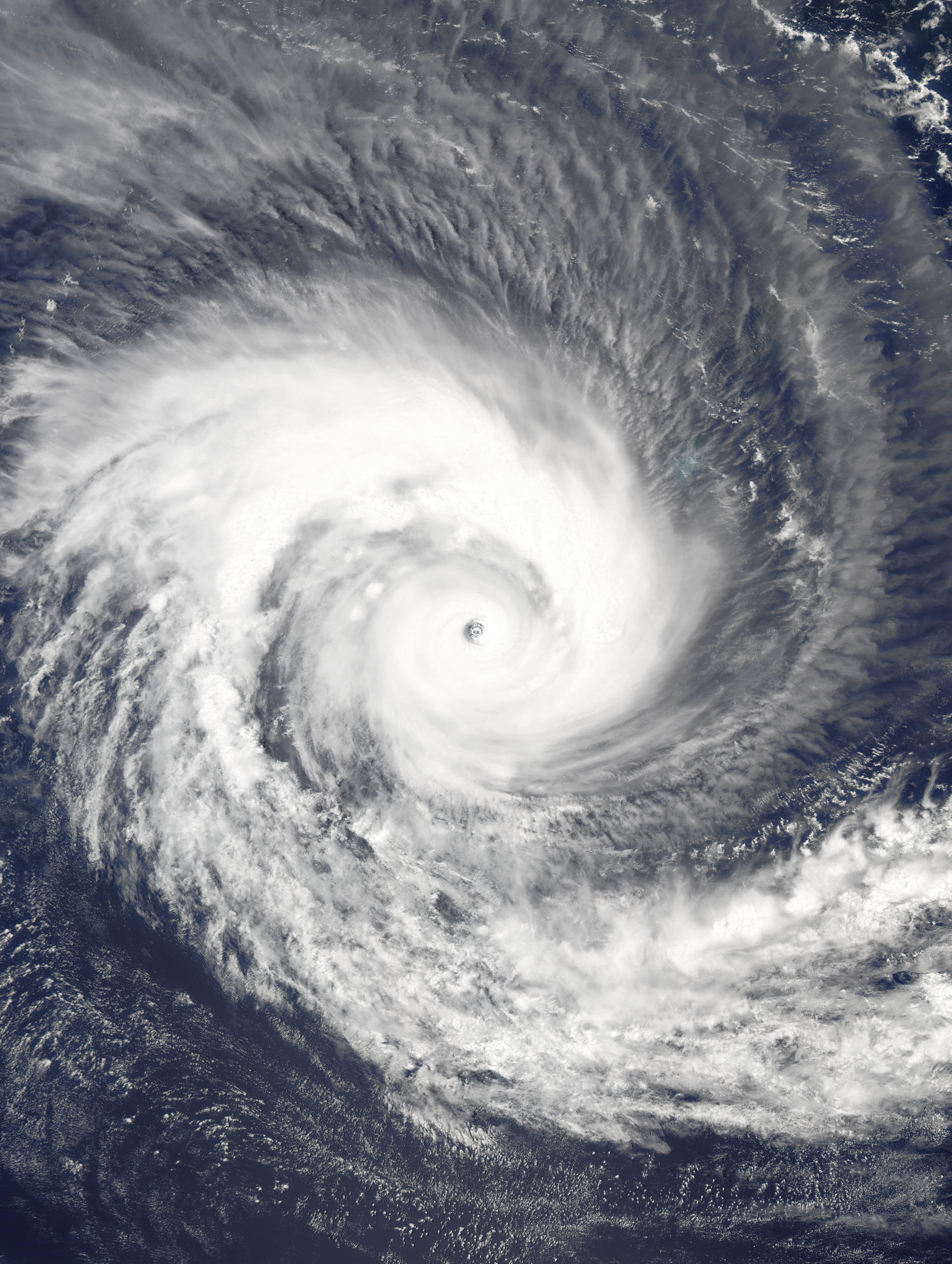
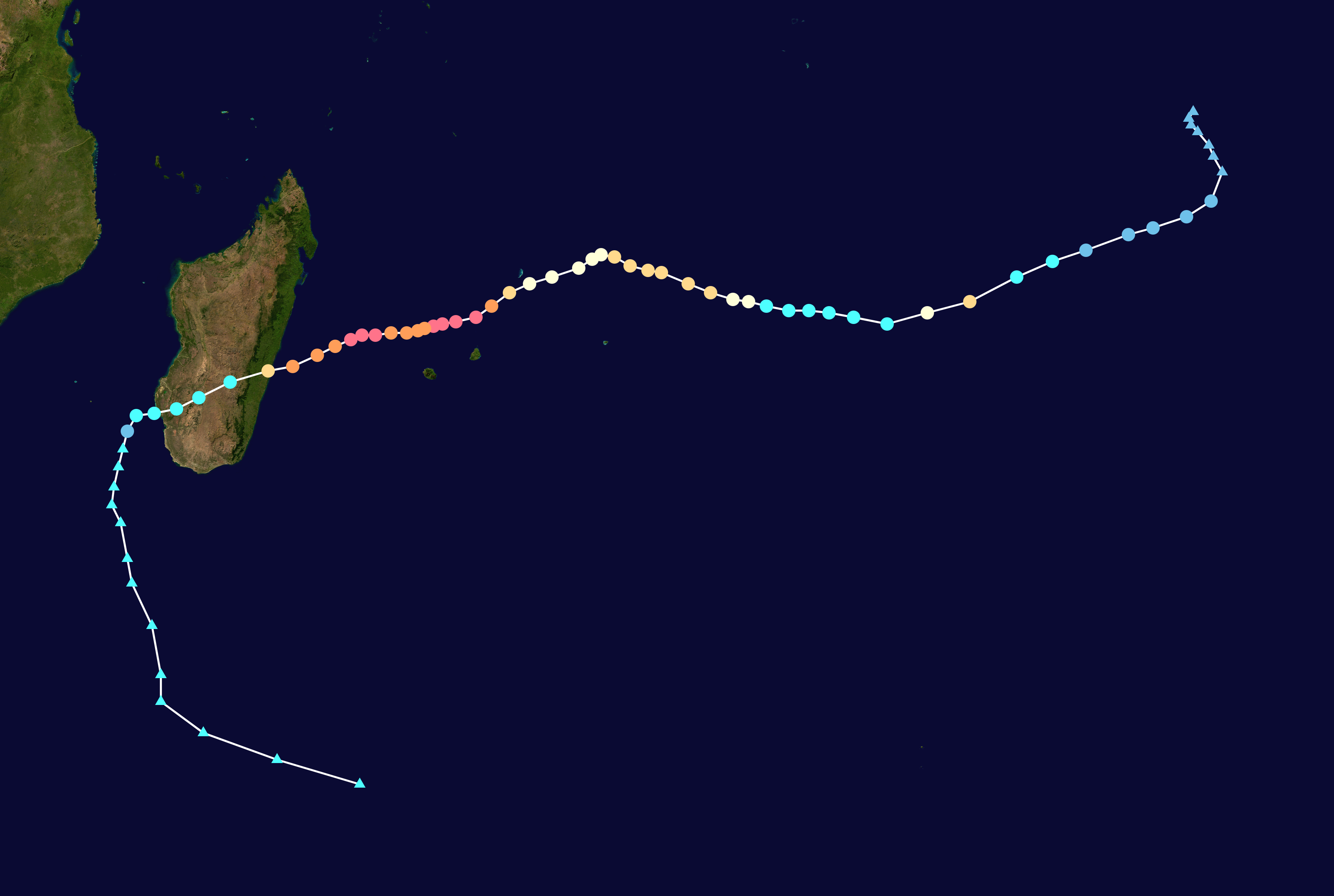
- Duration: 24 January – 8 February
- Peak intensity: 205 km/h (125 mph) (10-min); 923 hPa (mbar)

On 23 January, the JTWC noted an area of convection over the eastern part of the basin, located approximately 493 nmi (913 km; 567 mi) from the Cocos Islands, and gave a low chance for potential tropical cyclogenesis. However, by the next day, the agency issued a TCFA. At 06:00 UTC on 26 January, the MFR upgraded the system to a tropical disturbance, before the system intensified into a tropical depression on the next day. The JTWC upgraded the system to a tropical cyclone at 03:00 UTC on 27 January. Three hours later, the MFR upgraded it to a moderate tropical storm, naming it Batsirai. Between 06:00 UTC and 12:00 UTC, Batsirai underwent rapid deepening and intensified from a moderate tropical storm to an intense tropical cyclone within three hours. Two hours later, the JTWC upgraded it to a Category 2 tropical cyclone. The system started to rapidly weaken after its eye quickly collapsed and the cloud tops had warmed, so the MFR downgraded it to a tropical cyclone. At midnight on 28 January, it was further downgraded to a moderate tropical storm. The JTWC subsequently followed suit and downgraded it to a tropical storm.

Batsirai resumed its intensification after re-intensifying to a severe tropical storm status on the next day. By January 30, the JTWC upgraded it to a Category 2 tropical cyclone once again. The MFR further upgraded it to a tropical cyclone status at 12:00 UTC that same day. Three hours later, the JTWC upgraded it to a Category 3 tropical cyclone. However, it was short-lived, and it weakened to a Category 1 system on 1 February. The system then restrengthened back to Category 2 status. The MFR susbsequently upgraded Batsirai to an intense tropical cyclone. By the next day, it went through another round of rapid intensification, strengthening from a Category 2 to a Category 4 tropical cyclone, according to the JTWC. After reaching its peak at 12:00 UTC, satellite imagery depicted the formation of another eyewall, indicating the beginning of an eyewall replacement cycle. It weakened to a Category 3 system during this time. After completing the eyewall replacement cycle, the storm again briefly intensified into a Category 4 system, before it started to weaken again to a Category 3 system, due to land interaction with Madagascar. At 17:30 UTC on 5 February, it made landfall close to the city of Nosy Varika. The MFR declared that Batsirai had degenerated into an overland depression, with the JTWC downgrading it to a tropical storm. The system entered into the Mozambique Channel, where it re-intensified to a moderate tropical storm. By 7 February, it weakened into a remnant low before transitioning into a post-tropical cyclone. Despite fluctuating convective activity, high wind shear, and low sea surface temperatures, due to baroclinic forces, the MFR upgraded the system to a moderate tropical storm once more, before issuing their last advisory on the storm by the next day as it again transitioned into a post-tropical cyclone. The system was last noted on 11 February.

Batsirai caused major impacts to Mauritius, Réunion, and Madagascar, caused $190 million in damages, and caused 123 people to die. In Mauritius and Reunion, an estimated 43,500 homes lost power due to the storm. A total of 138 people sought refuge in evacuation centers. Power girds in Madagascar were also knocked out. Agricultural losses in Reunion amounted an estimated €47 million (US$53.1 million).

=== Moderate Tropical Storm Cliff ===
- Moderate tropical storm (MFR)
- Tropical storm (SSHWS)
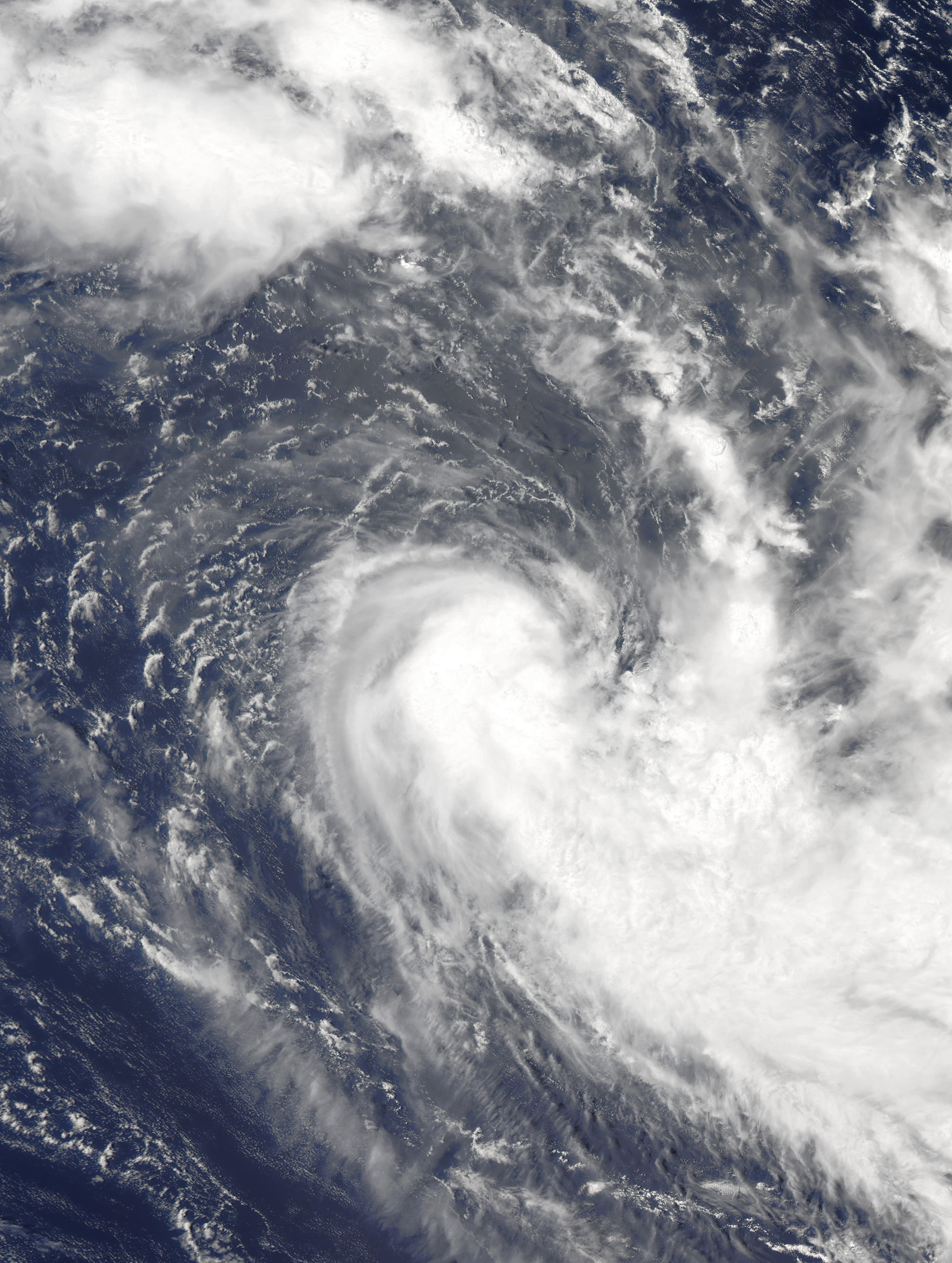
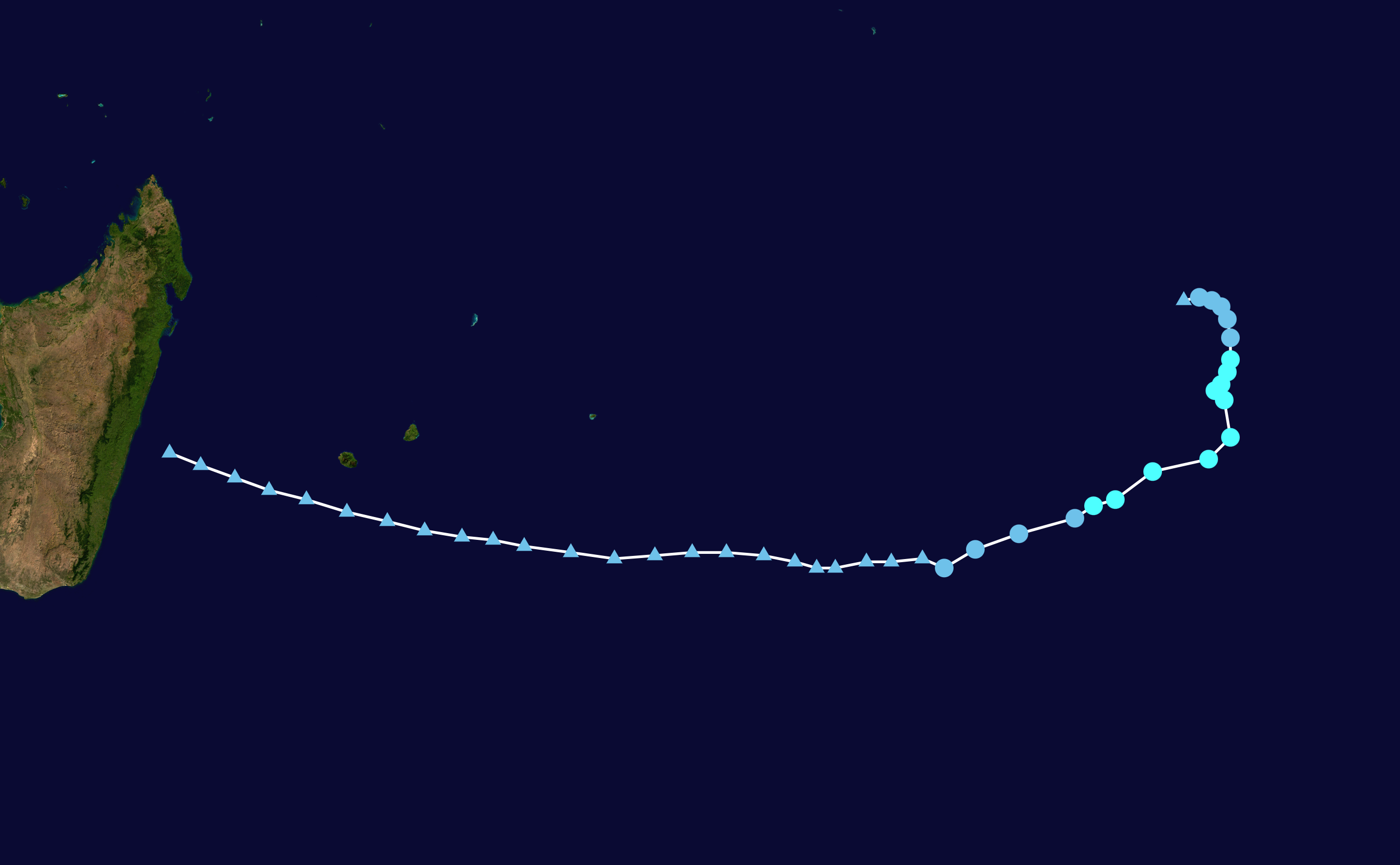
- Duration: 3 February – 5 February
- Peak intensity: 85 km/h (50 mph) (10-min); 991 hPa (mbar)

On 31 January, the MFR reported the formation of a weak area of low pressure east of Cyclone Batsirai, which the JTWC recognized as Invest 90S at 08:00 UTC of 2 February. Two days later at 03:00 UTC, the JTWC issued a TCFA for the invest, upgrading it to a tropical cyclone shortly after, noting the defined but obscured LLC. At midday, the MFR followed, and declared the same low as a tropical depression. Later in the evening, the MFR upgraded it to a moderate tropical storm and was given the name Cliff. By midnight of 5 February, Cliff weakened as it lost organization, with its convection being displaced south of its LLC. By 06:00 UTC, Cliff further weakened due to an intrusion of dry air and further strengthening of northwesterly wind shear. Six hours later, the MFR issued its last bulletin and declared it as a "filling up" low. On the next day at 21:00 UTC, the JTWC also issued its final warning on Cliff. The remnants of Cliff meandered in the open-sea and briefly passed west of the Reunion island on 11 February, dissipating completely on 12 February.

=== Moderate Tropical Storm Dumako ===
- Severe tropical storm (MFR)
- Tropical storm (SSHWS)
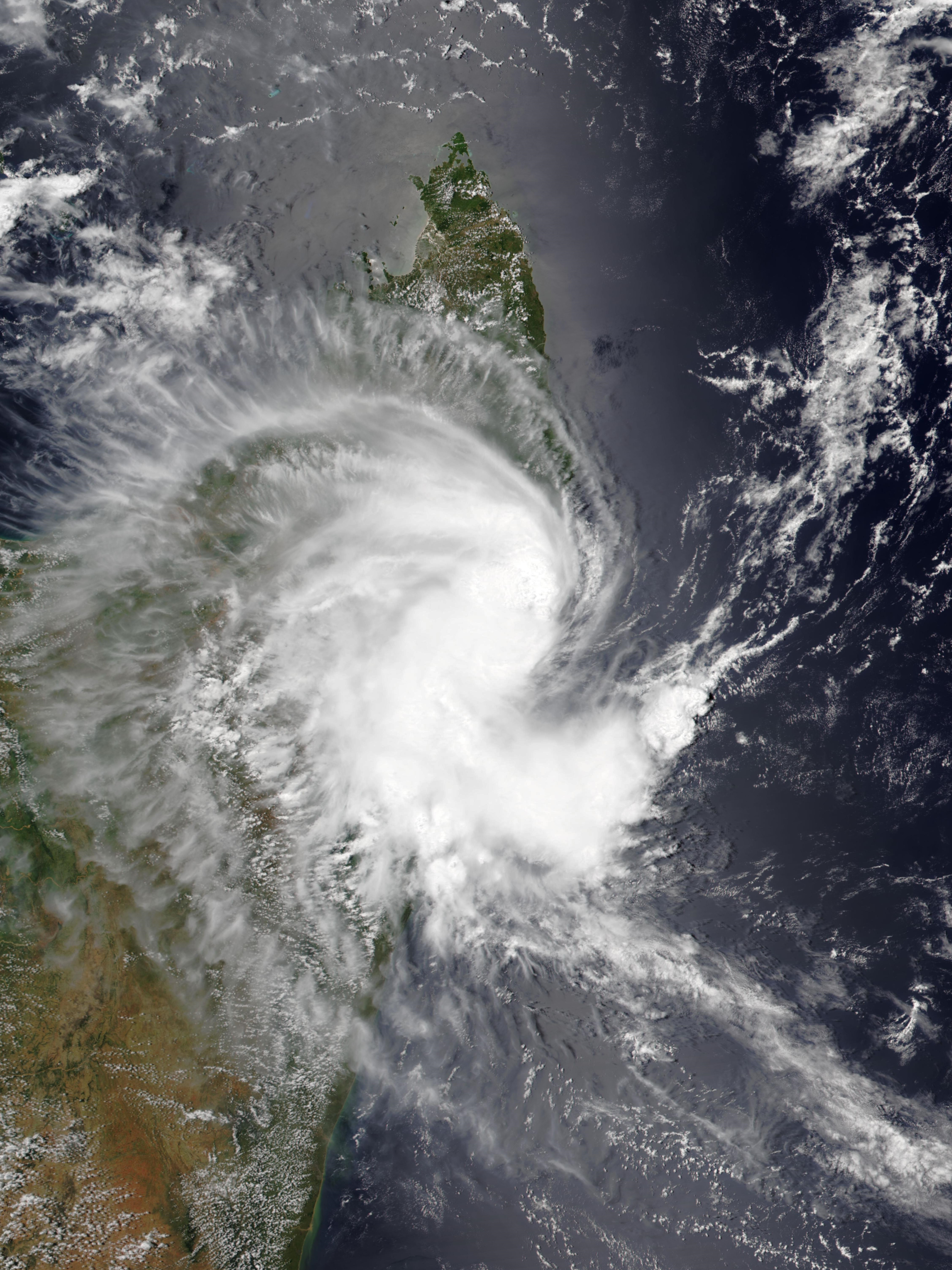
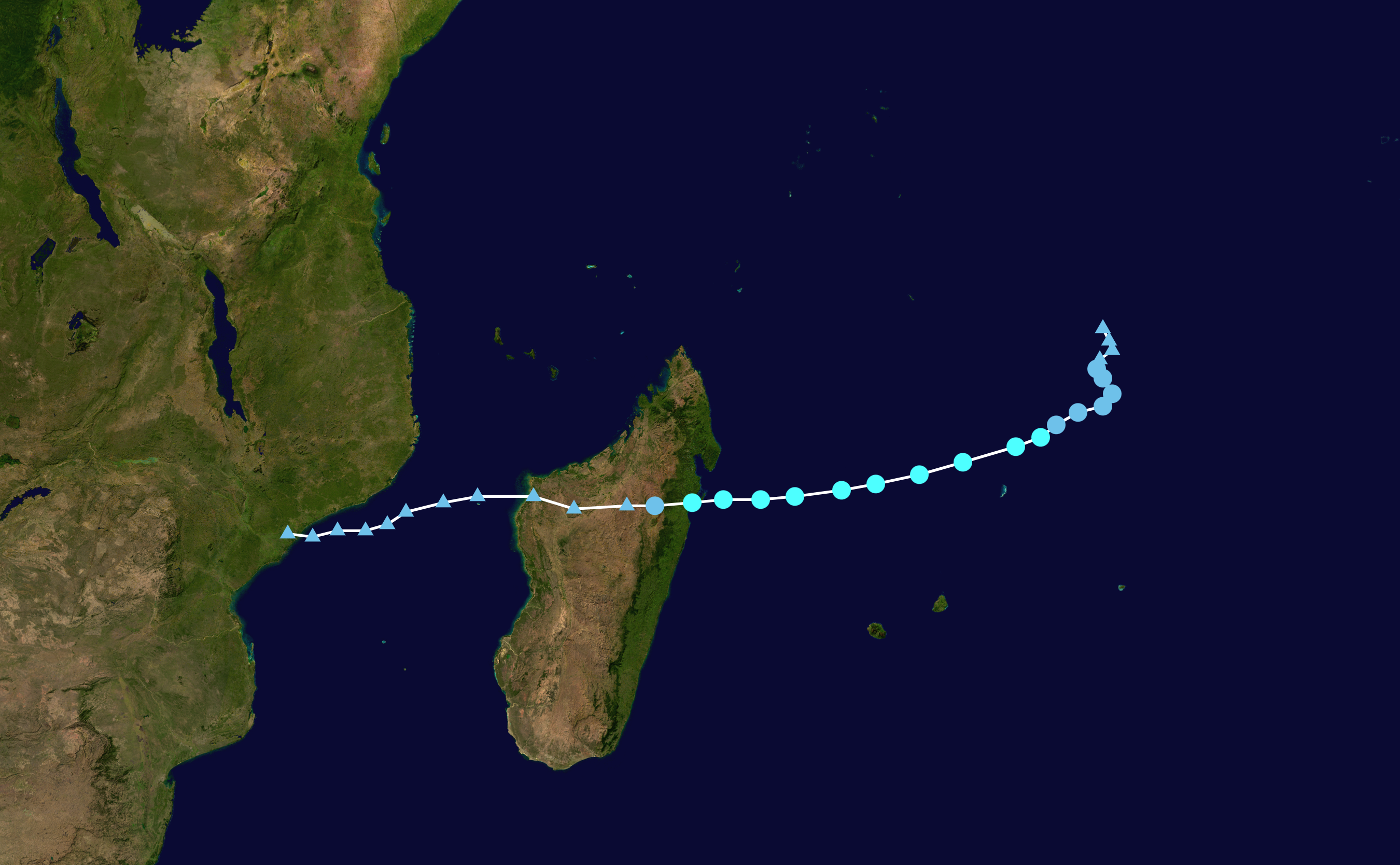
- Duration: 10 February – 18 February
- Peak intensity: 95 km/h (60 mph) (10-min); 992 hPa (mbar)

On 10 February, MFR began monitoring an area of disturbed weather, with the JTWC designating the system as an invest a day later. By 12 February, it had been upgraded to a tropical disturbance by MFR, before being upgraded to a tropical depression later that day. The JTWC assessed that the system had developed into a tropical cyclone on 13 February, giving it the designation 12S. MFR upgraded the system to a moderate tropical storm later that day, being given the name Dumako by the Mauritius Meteorological Service. By 14 February at 00:00 UTC, MFR estimated Dumako to have peaked in intensity, with maximum 10-minute sustained winds of 95 kilometres per hour (60 mph) and a minimum central pressure of 992 hPa (29.29 inHg). Dumako continued westward, and by the next day, it had made landfall near Sainte-Marie Island. MFR downgraded Dumako to a tropical depression later that day, with the JTWC doing the same at 00:00 UTC on 16 February. Dumako re-emerged over water on the same day, before being assessed to have lost tropical depression status by MFR on 17 February. Dumako dissipated on 18 February as it made landfall over Mozambique close to the city of Quelimane.

In Madagascar, at least 113 houses were damaged, more than 5000 people were affected. Flooding killed at least 14 people in Madagascar and 4,323 people were displaced. Heavy rain was recorded in South Malawi and caused flooding in some areas. The city of Quelimane experienced flooding, with power lines experiencing damage. 160 families were displaced and 30 hectares (74 acres) of crops were destroyed in Malema District. No deaths were reported in Mozambique and Malawi. Losses are estimated at US$5 million.

=== Intense Tropical Cyclone Emnati ===
- Intense tropical cyclone (MFR)
- Category 4 tropical cyclone (SSHWS)
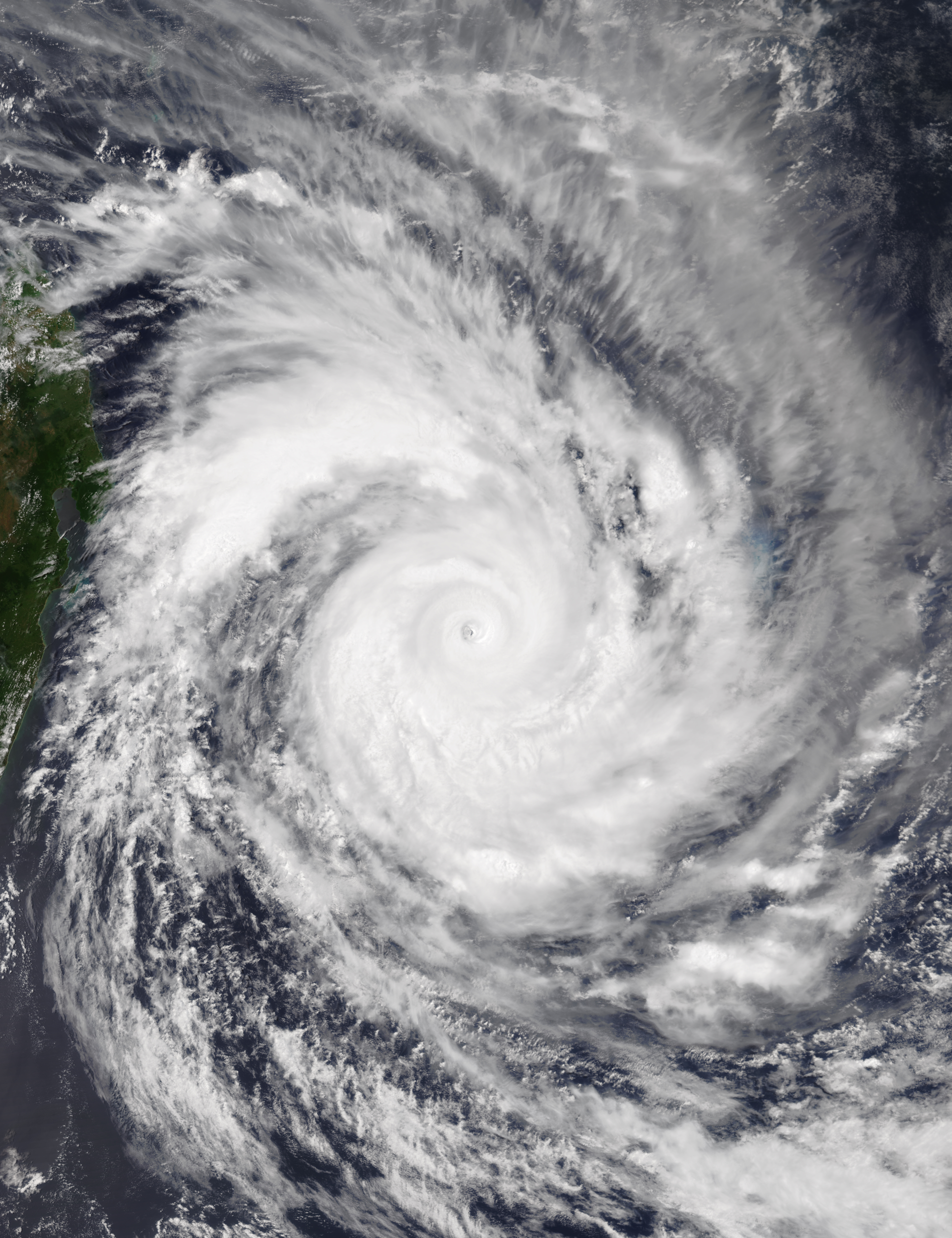
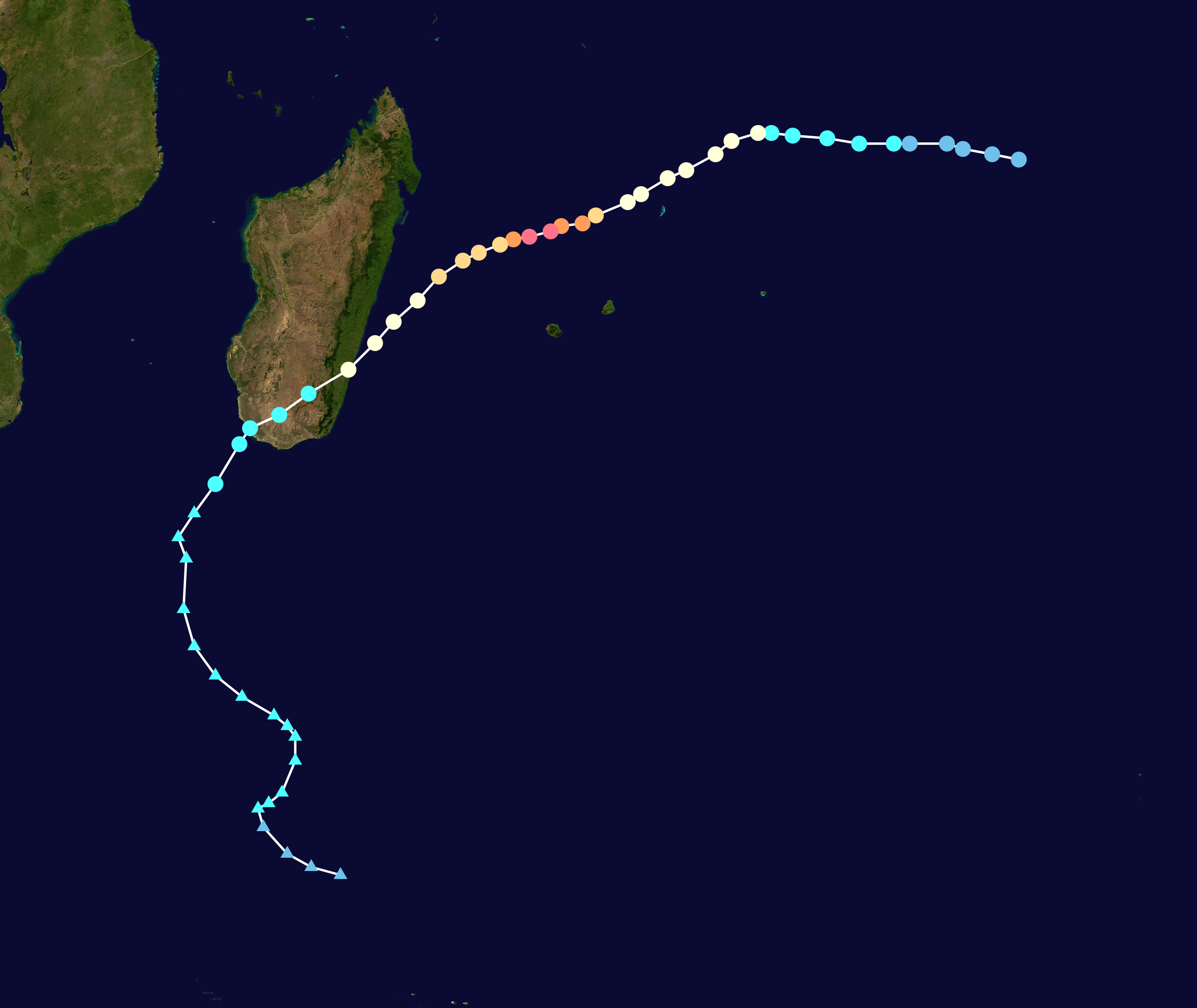
- Duration: 15 February – 24 February
- Peak intensity: 175 km/h (110 mph) (10-min); 935 hPa (mbar)

Emnati initially developed as a zone of disturbed weather, where it moved westwards over the open waters in Indian Ocean. Environmental conditions were assessed as being marginally conducive for tropical cyclogenesis, with the disturbance being located about 420 nautical miles (780 km; 480 mi) south of Diego Garcia. On the same day, the JTWC issued a Tropical Cyclone Formation Alert for the system, and by 21:00 UTC, the JTWC initiated advisories on the system and classified it as Tropical Cyclone 13S. The next day, the system organized into a tropical disturbance. The system continued organizing, and at 12:00 UTC, MFR upgraded the system to a tropical depression. By 17 February, the MFR reported that the system had become a moderate tropical storm, and the Sub-Regional Tropical Cyclone Advisory Center in Mauritius named it Emnati. It underwent a period of rapid intensification, gaining hurricane-force winds according to the JTWC, before ceasing intensification due to cool waters upwelled by Cyclone Batsirai. Its intensity fluctuated for two days, before undergoing another period of rapid intensification on 20 February to become a Category 3-equivalent tropical cyclone. Continuing to intensify, at 12:00 UTC of the same day, the cyclone peaked as an intense tropical cyclone, with the MFR estimating 10-minute sustained winds of 175 kilometres per hour (110 mph) with a minimum central pressure of 940 hPa. The JTWC estimated it to have peaked as a Category 4-equivalent tropical cyclone with 1-minute sustained winds of 215 kilometres per hour (130 mph). Shortly after reaching its peak intensity, due to the upwelled sea and an eyewall replacement cycle, the storm began to weaken below intense tropical cyclone intensity by 06:00 UTC on the next day. Similarly, the land interaction with Madagascar affected the storm's overall structure. At 23:00 UTC on 22 February, the storm made landfall near Manakara with winds of 120 kilometres per hour (75 mph) according to both MFR and the JTWC. Weakening slowly, it entered into the Mozambique Channel at 21:00 UTC of the next day. Due to cooler waters and very high wind shear, it began to transition into a subtropical cyclone, with the JTWC issued its final warning at 21:00 UTC on 24 February and MFR doing the same six hours earlier.

Emnati caused impacts to Mauritius, Réunion, and Madagascar, about $15 million in damages, and caused 15 deaths.

=== Severe Tropical Storm Fezile ===
- Severe tropical storm (MFR)
- Subtropical storm (SSHWS)
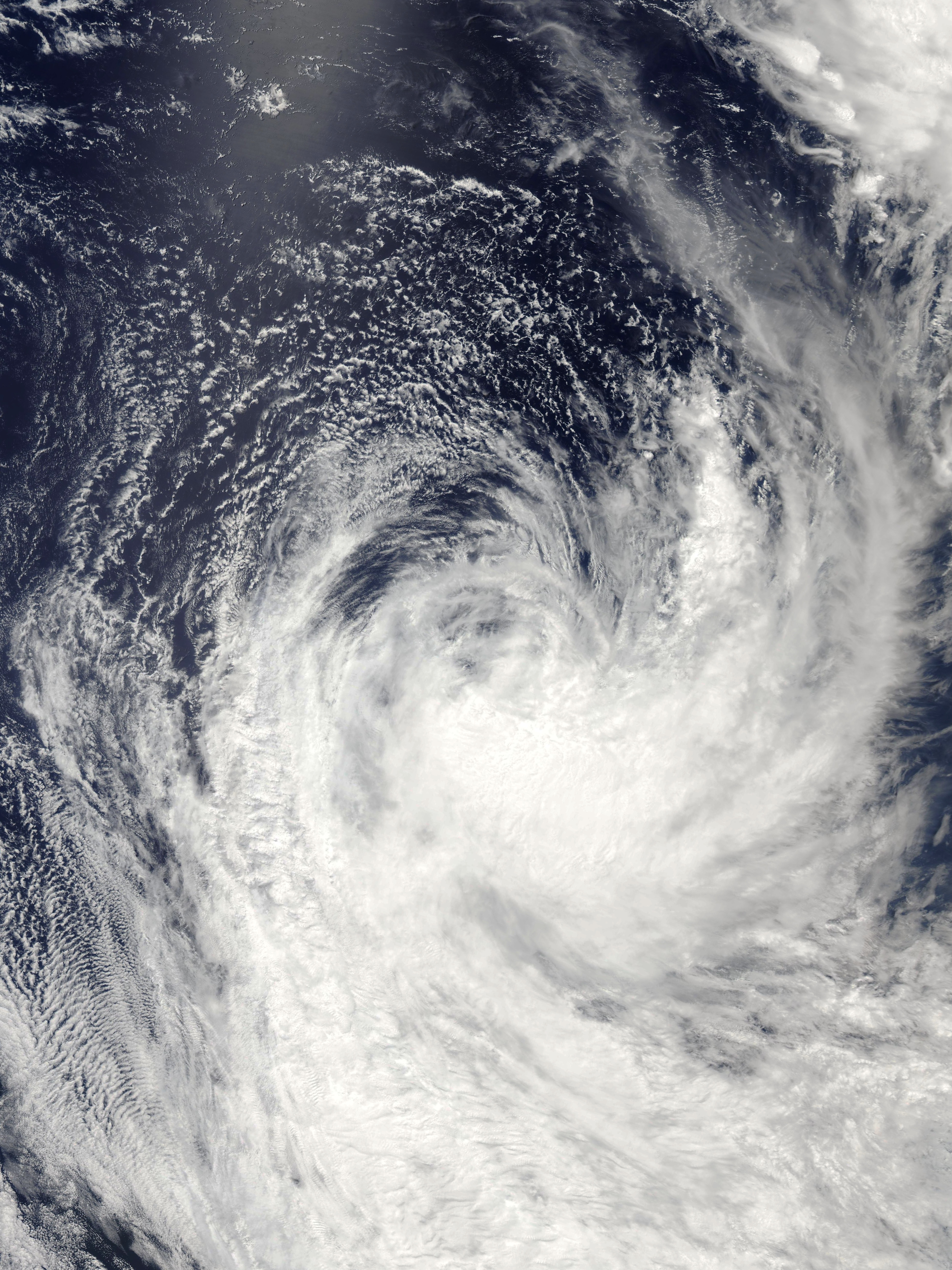
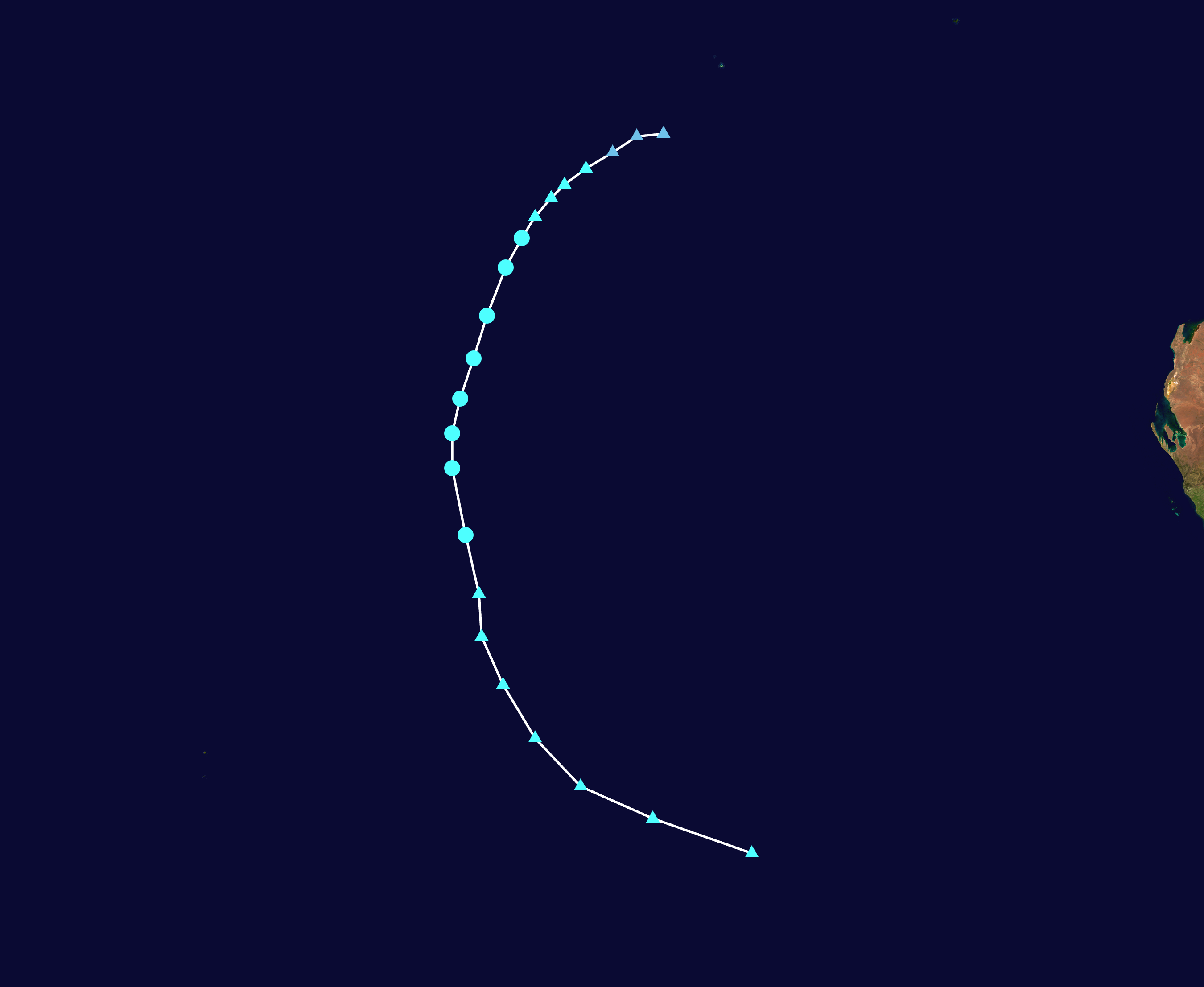
- Duration: 16 February (Entered basin) – 18 February
- Peak intensity: 100 km/h (65 mph) (10-min); 975 hPa (mbar)

During 16 February, the MFR reported that a low-pressure system which was labelled as Tropical Low 19U by the Australian Bureau of Meteorology entered the basin. The agency re-assessed it as Zone of Disturbed Weather 06, with the system having an ill-defined center and fluctuating convection. On the same day, the JTWC issued a TCFA following deepening of the system's convective bands and the organization of its LLC. After maintaining the same intensity for two days, the system intensified into a moderate tropical storm at midnight of 18 February. The Mauritius Meteorological Service named the storm as Fezile. The system's cloud pattern rapidly organized, with numerous satellite imagery depicting the formation of curved bands. However, three hours later, the JTWC cancelled its TCFA as the system started its subtropical transition, with the MFR noting its convective structure weakening and being continuously sheared by 06:00 UTC. Fezile's structure was affected by wind shear, until later that evening, when Fezile became a post-tropical cyclone and began extratropical transition. Fezile completely dissipated shortly after.

=== Intense Tropical Cyclone Vernon ===
- Intense tropical cyclone (MFR)
- Category 4 tropical cyclone (SSHWS)
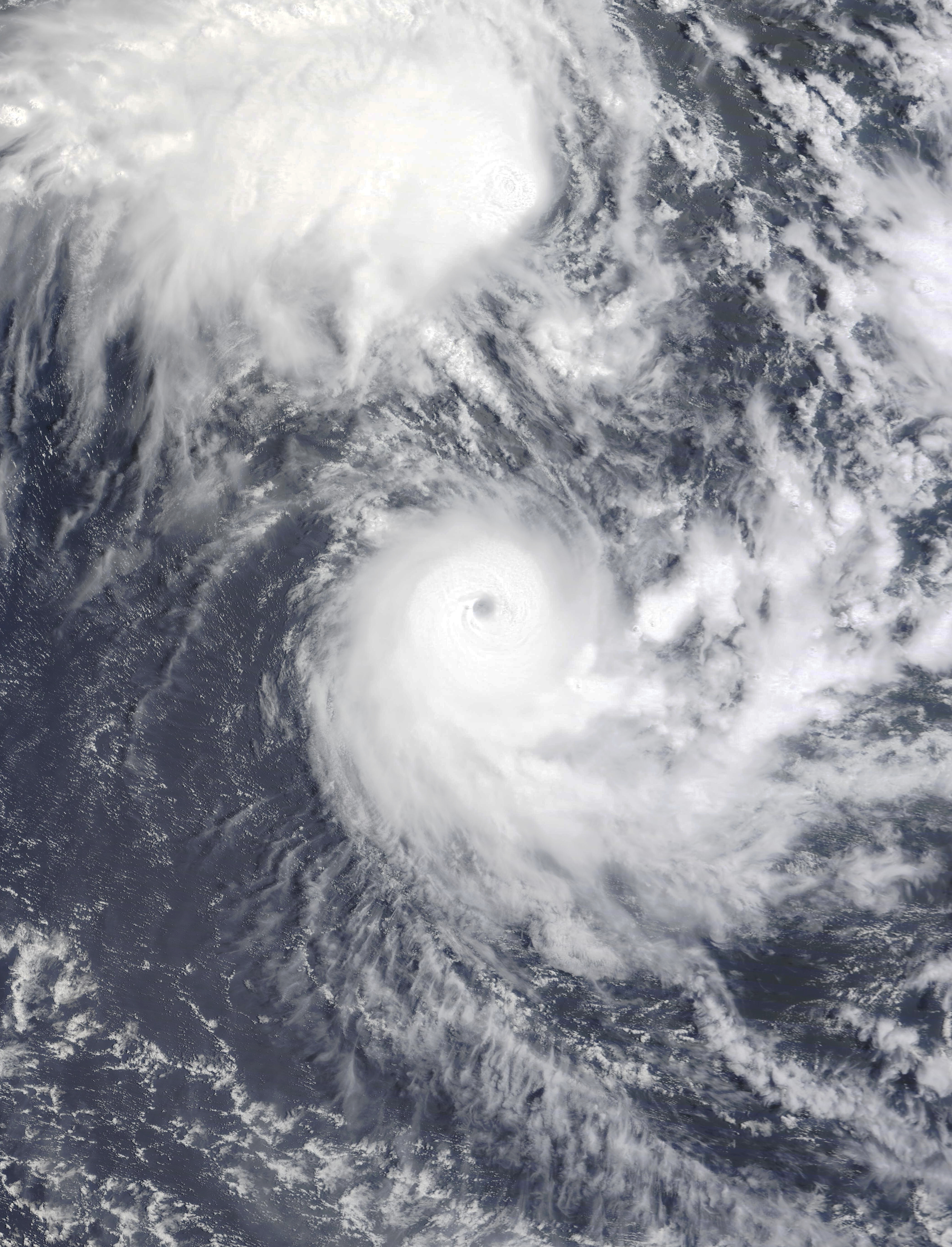
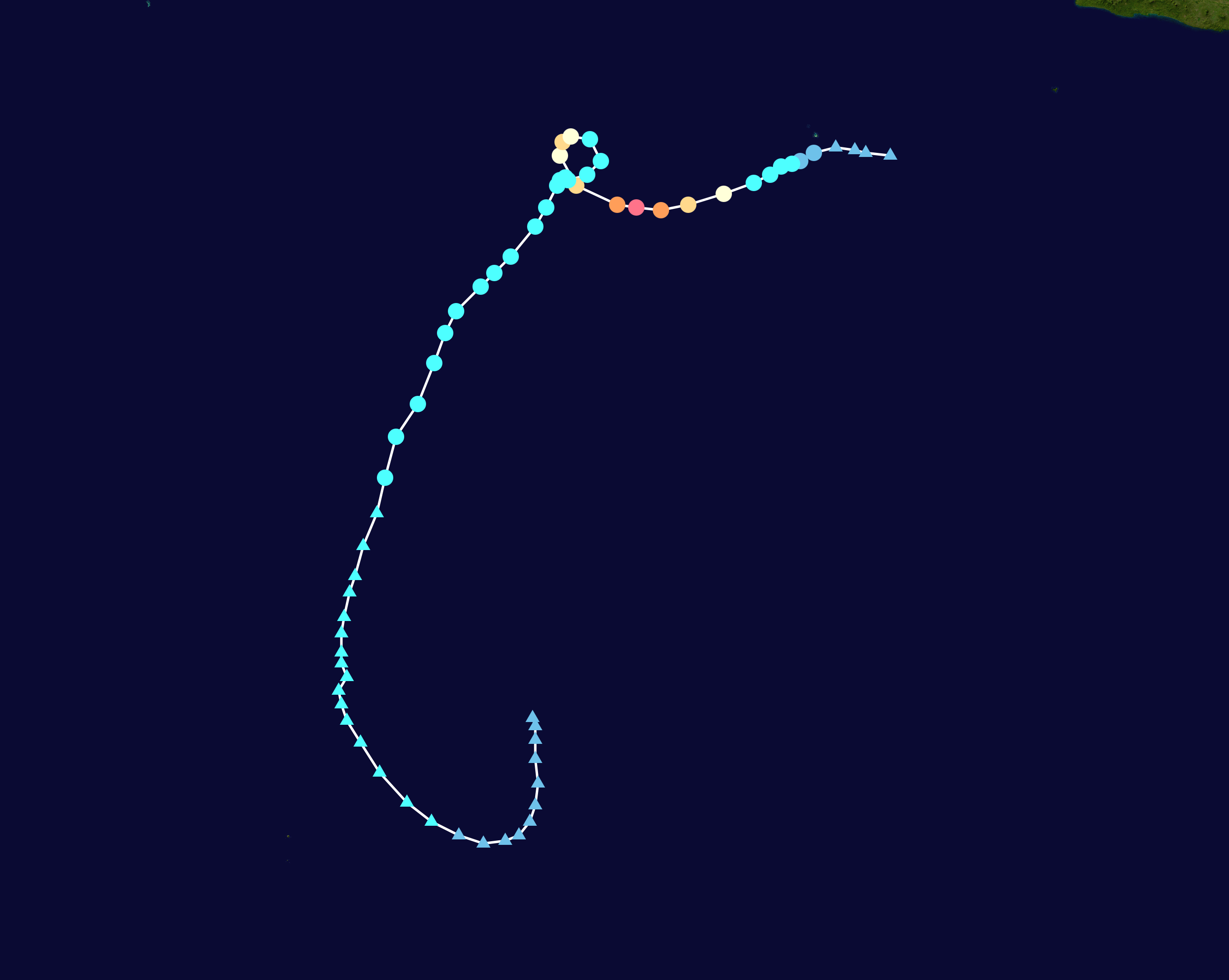
- Duration: 26 February (Entered basin) – 3 March
- Peak intensity: 205 km/h (125 mph) (10-min); 940 hPa (mbar)

On 26 February, when Vernon entered the MFR's area of responsibility (AoR), it was assessed as an intense tropical cyclone on the SWIO scale, with maximum 10-minute sustained winds of 195 km/h (120 mph) and a central atmospheric pressure of 950 hPa (28.47 inHg).At this time, the JTWC subsequently reported that the cyclone reached Category 4-equivalent status on the Saffir–Simpson scale. This was short-lived, however, as it began a Fujiwhara interaction with Tropical Depression 08 to its northwest, causing it to weaken rapidly to a tropical storm. Maintaining its intensity, it soon entered into favourable conditions in which the storm peaked again as a severe tropical storm according to MFR, with winds estimated at 95 kilometres per hour (60 mph). However, by 2 March, it began to undergo subtropical transition as it entered lower latitudes, and the JTWC issued its final warning on 21:00 UTC of the same day. The MFR tracked the system until 18:00 UTC of 3 March.

=== Moderate Tropical Storm 08 ===
- Moderate tropical storm (MFR)
- Tropical storm (SSHWS)
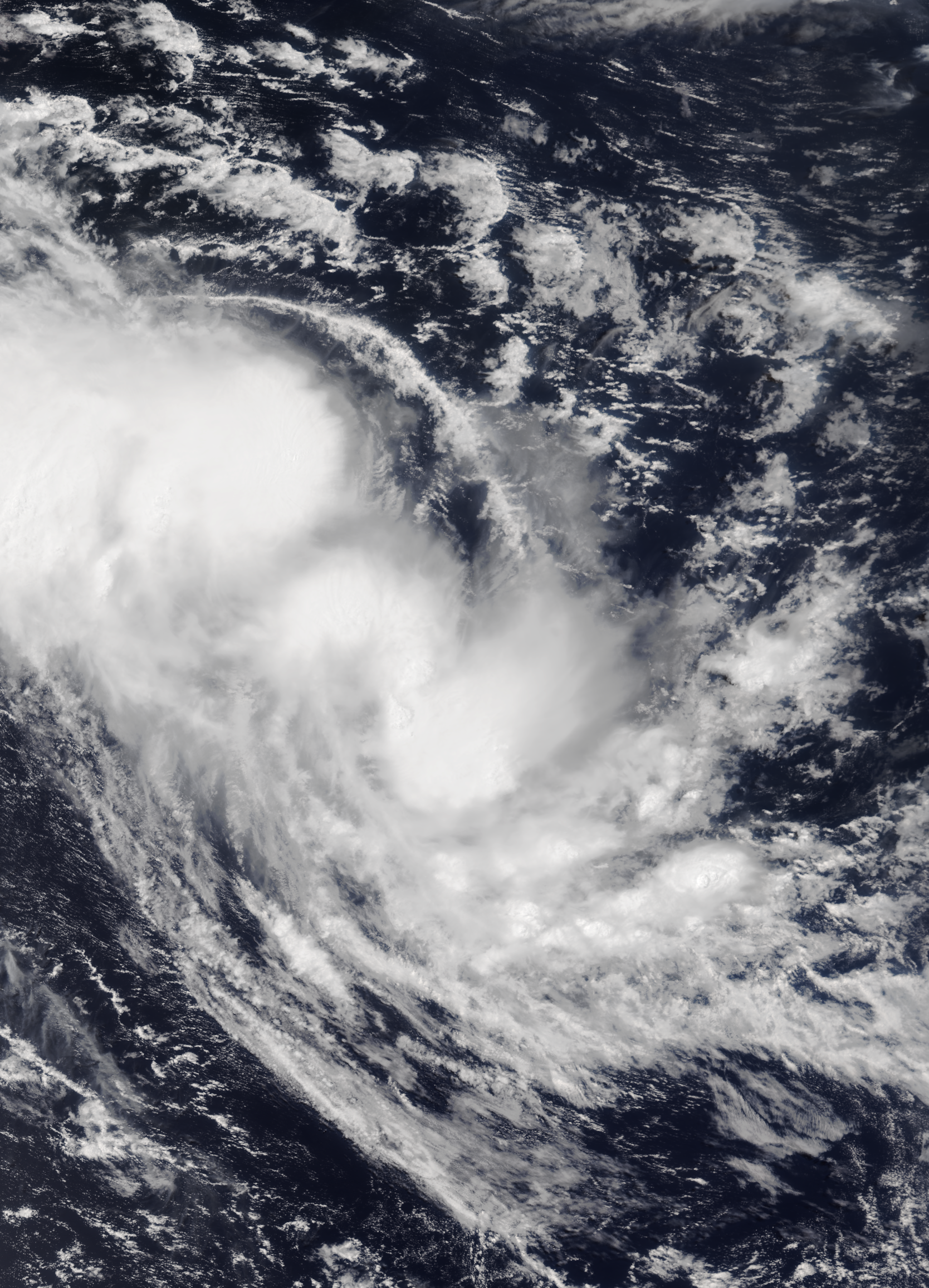
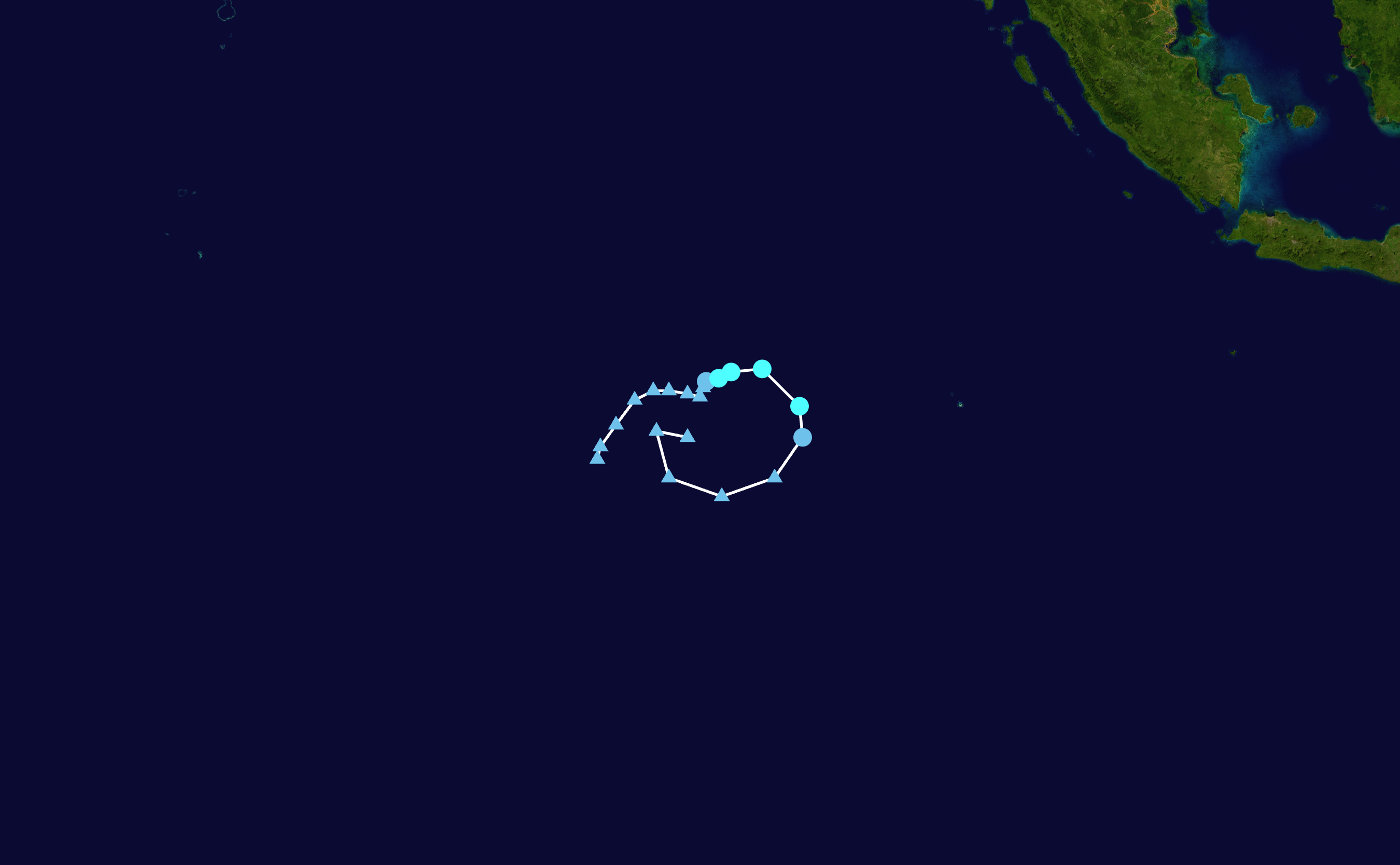
- Duration: 23 February – 26 February (Out of basin from 26-27 February)
- Peak intensity: 75 km/h (45 mph) (10-min); 995 hPa (mbar)

Tropical Depression 08 initially formed on 23 February as a low-pressure area, which was located very close to Cyclone Vernon. Two days later, the JTWC started to monitor the same disturbance as Invest 93S. At 06:00 UTC of 27 February, the MFR upgraded it to a tropical depression as it orbited near Vernon. After maintaining its convection for a day, the MFR issued its last advisory for Tropical Depression 08, as it underwent a Fujiwhara interaction with Vernon. Its convection had decayed and its low-level center had become ill-defined as a result of the interaction, and due to this, the JTWC had also stopped monitoring the invest on the next day. In post-analysis, MFR upgraded the system to Moderate Tropical Storm 08.

=== Tropical Cyclone Gombe ===
- Tropical cyclone (MFR)
- Category 3 tropical cyclone (SSHWS)
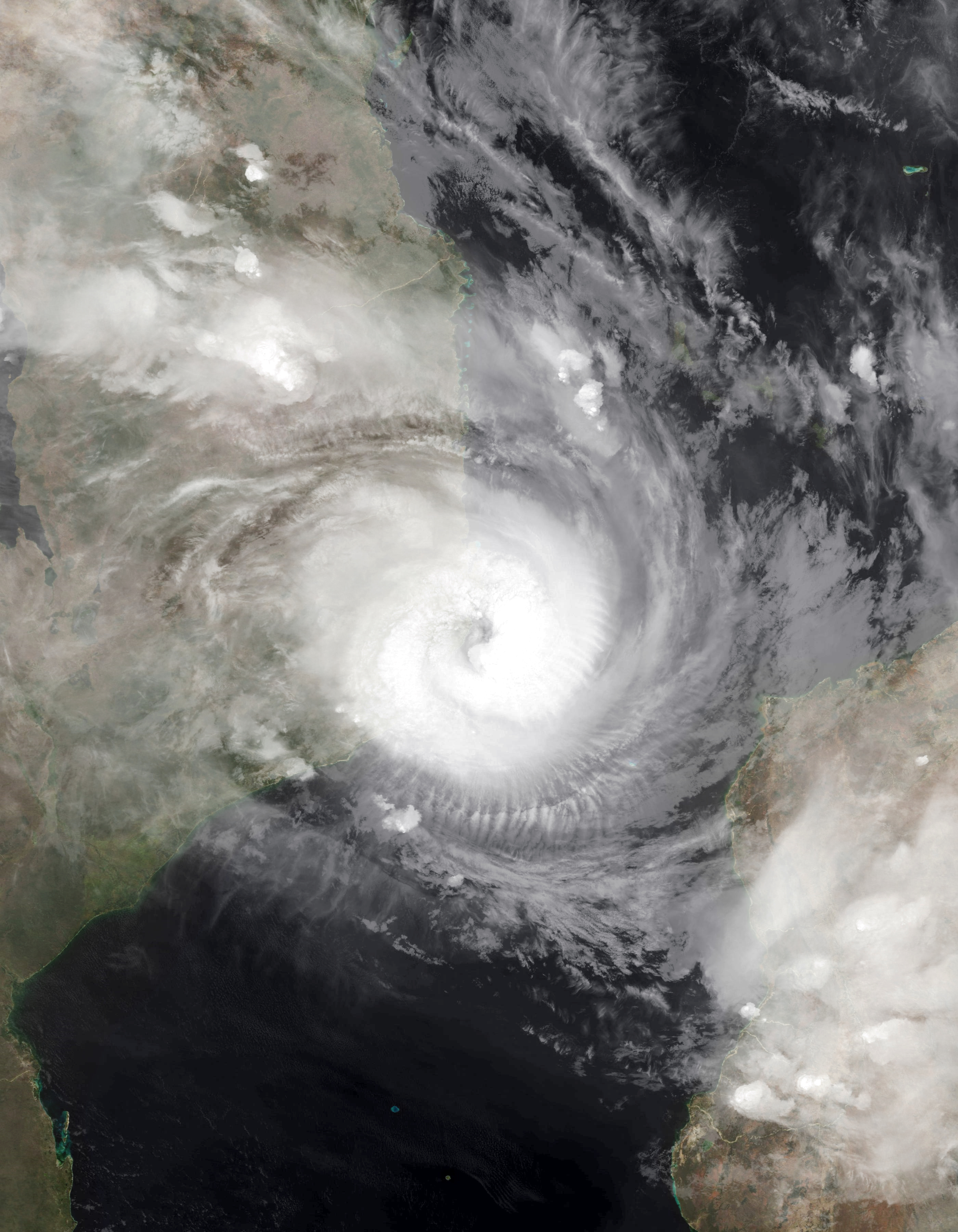
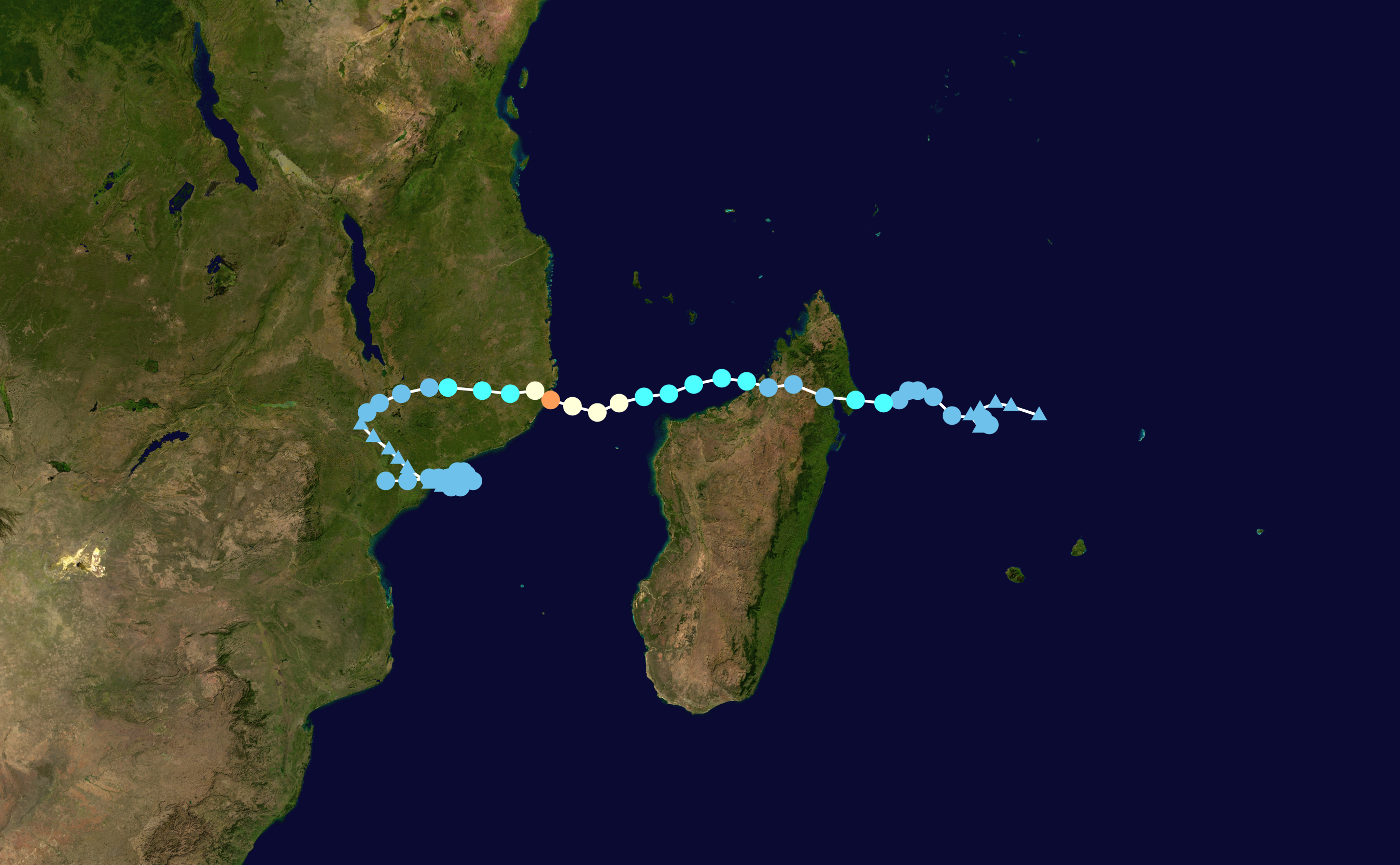
- Duration: 5 March – 17 March
- Peak intensity: 155 km/h (100 mph) (10-min); 955 hPa (mbar)

On 6 March, the MFR began to monitor a zone of disturbed weather located approximately 280 nmi (520 km; 320 mi) from Mauritius, moving northward. The JTWC later tagged the system as Invest 97S, and issued a TCFA for the storm at 11:40 UTC on 6 March. The next day, the MFR upgraded it to a tropical depression on 12:00 UTC, with it being named Moderate Tropical Storm Gombe six hours later. The JTWC followed, upgrading Gombe to a tropical storm with winds of 35 kn (65 km/h; 40 mph) at 18:00 UTC on 7 March. The MFR re-classified Gombe as an overland depression at 06:00 UTC as it made landfall in northern Madagascar on 8 March, and the JTWC downgraded the storm to a tropical depression. 24 hours later, Gombe emerged over the Mozambique Channel, and strengthened back to a tropical storm. Gombe gradually re-developed its structure, and then intensified to a high-end tropical storm late on 9 March, and gained Category 1-equivalent winds by 06:00 UTC on 10 March. As it neared landfall on Nampula Province, it underwent rapid intensification and strengthened from 65 to 100 kn (120 to 185 km/h; 75 to 115 mph) in 18 hours. The MFR upgraded Gombe to the fourth Intense Tropical Cyclone of the year at the same time. Following Gombe's landfall in Mozambique, it proceeded to lose most of its convection the next day. The MFR downgraded the storm to an Overland Depression for the second time on 06:00 UTC on 11 March. In the technical bulletin released on 17 March by the MFR, the agency noted that what was left of Gombe reorganized itself into a tropical depression in the Mozambique channel. Later that day, however, the MFR issued their final bulletin on the storm.

Mozambique was particularly hard-hit by Gombe, with approximately 736,000 people directly affected. A total of 63 people died and 108 others were injured in the country.

=== Intense Tropical Cyclone Halima ===
- Intense tropical cyclone (MFR)
- Category 4 tropical cyclone (SSHWS)
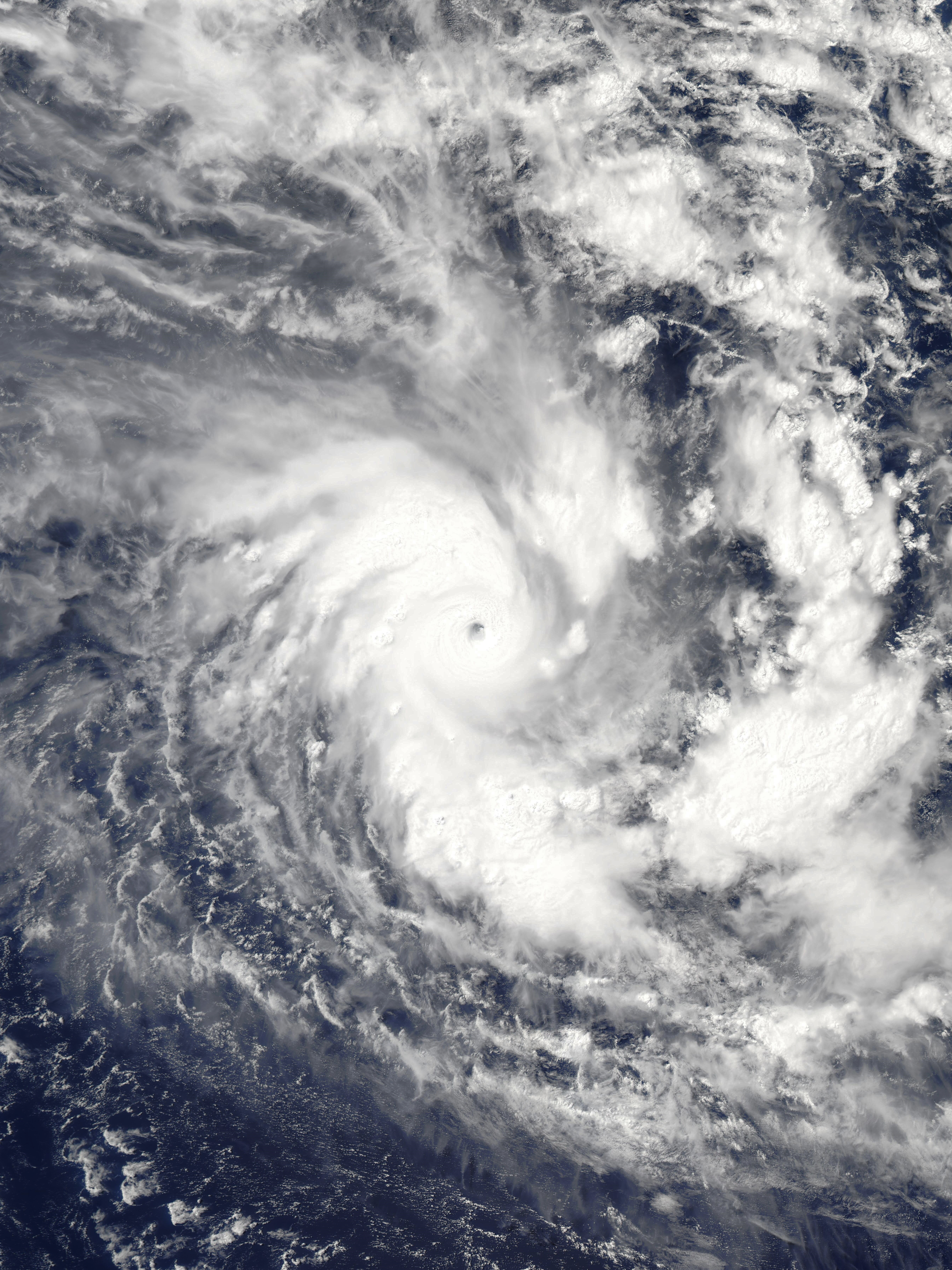
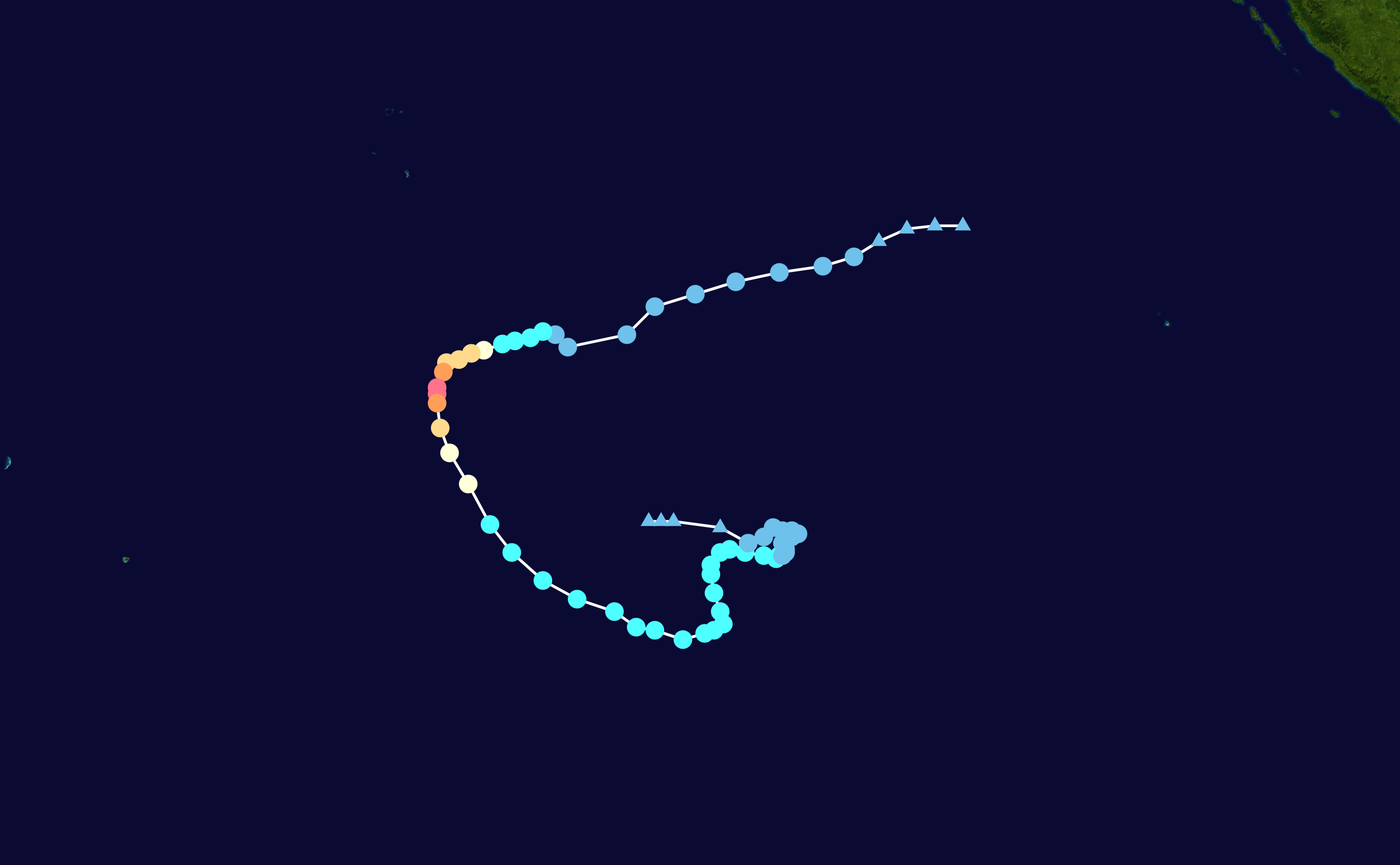
- Duration: 20 March – 1 April
- Peak intensity: 205 km/h (125 mph) (10-min); 937 hPa (mbar)

In a bulletin released by the MFR on 21 March, a climate disturbance zone was detected in the northeast of the agency's area of responsibility. The area organized and became a tropical depression, being designated 10. The system underwent tropical cyclogenesis on the morning of 23 March, and was subsequently upgraded to a moderate tropical storm, being given the name Halima by the MFR. The storm again intensified on the afternoon of 24 March, and the MFR upgraded it to a severe tropical storm. At 18:00 UTC of the same day, the MFR released another technical bulletin, informing that the low pressure intensified into a Category 1 equivalent tropical cyclone. On the morning of 25 March, Halima strengthened to an intense tropical cyclone according to the MFR. Halima would then slowly weaken and dissipating on 1 April without affecting land.

=== Subtropical Depression Issa ===
- Subtropical depression (MFR)
- Subtropical storm (SSHWS)
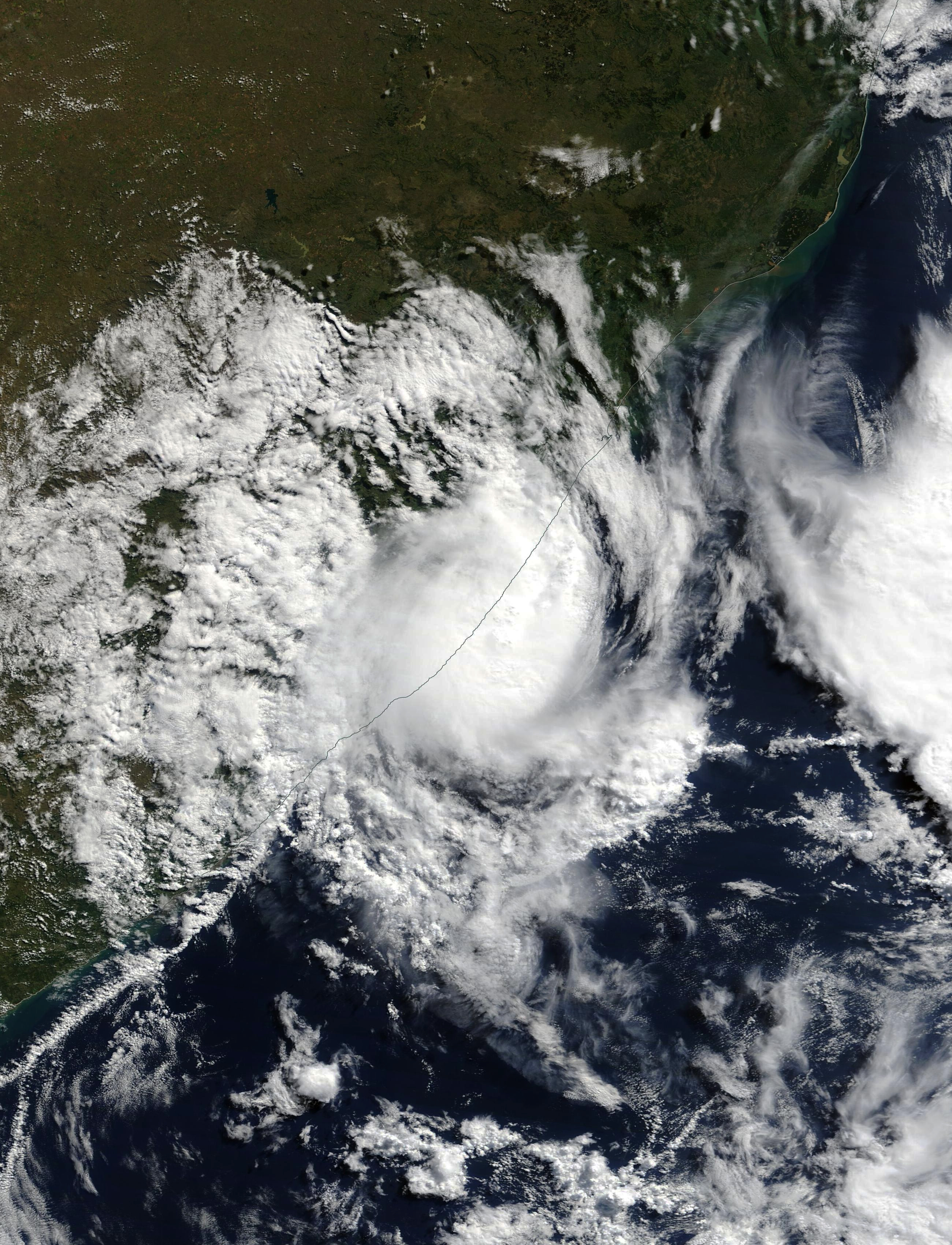
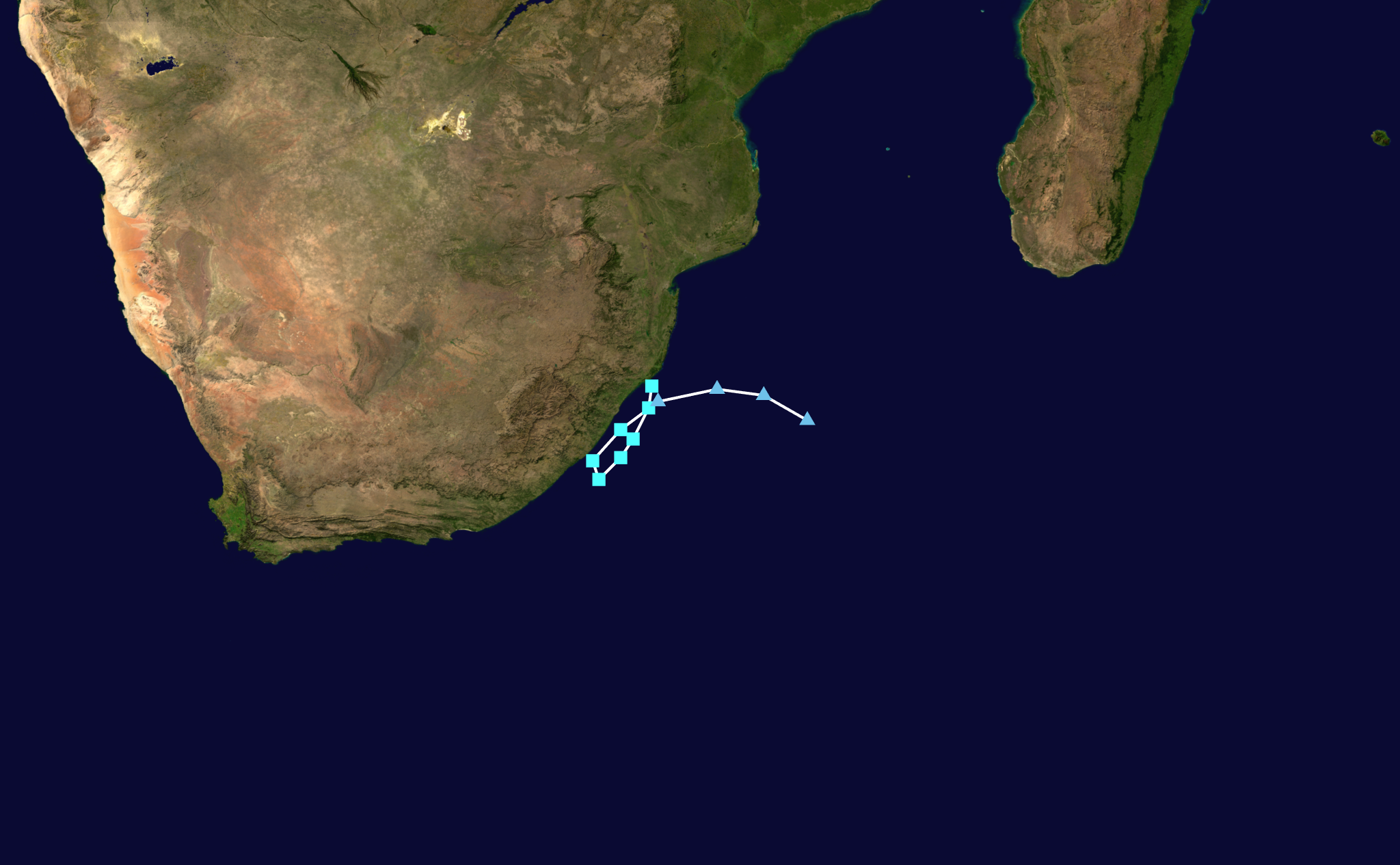
- Duration: 12 April – 13 April
- Peak intensity: 95 km/h (60 mph) (10-min); 993 hPa (mbar)

On 11 April, a low-pressure area evolved near the southeast coast of South Africa from the interaction of an upper-level trough and warmer air near the surface. With warm ocean temperatures and low wind shear, the low developed intense thunderstorms which wrapped around a tight circulation, and dropped heavy rainfall in eastern South Africa. On 12 April, the MFR designated the low as Subtropical Depression Issa, based on the system's structure and the presence of gale-force winds. Issa moved slowly to the south at first, strengthening to reach 10-minute sustained winds of 95 km/h (60 mph) late on 12 April. At its peak, the storm had an eye-like feature in the middle of a symmetrical area of thunderstorms. On 13 April, the JTWC classified this system as a subtropical storm in an unofficial bulletin. Issa turned to the north back toward the South African coast due to the trough in the region. Increased wind shear and dry air stripped away the thunderstorms near the center, weakening the storm, and causing the MFR to discontinue advisories on 13 April.

Issa exacerbated catastrophic floodings in KwaZulu-Natal, South Africa, that killed 435 people.

=== Severe Tropical Storm Jasmine ===
- Severe tropical storm (MFR)
- Category 1 tropical cyclone (SSHWS)
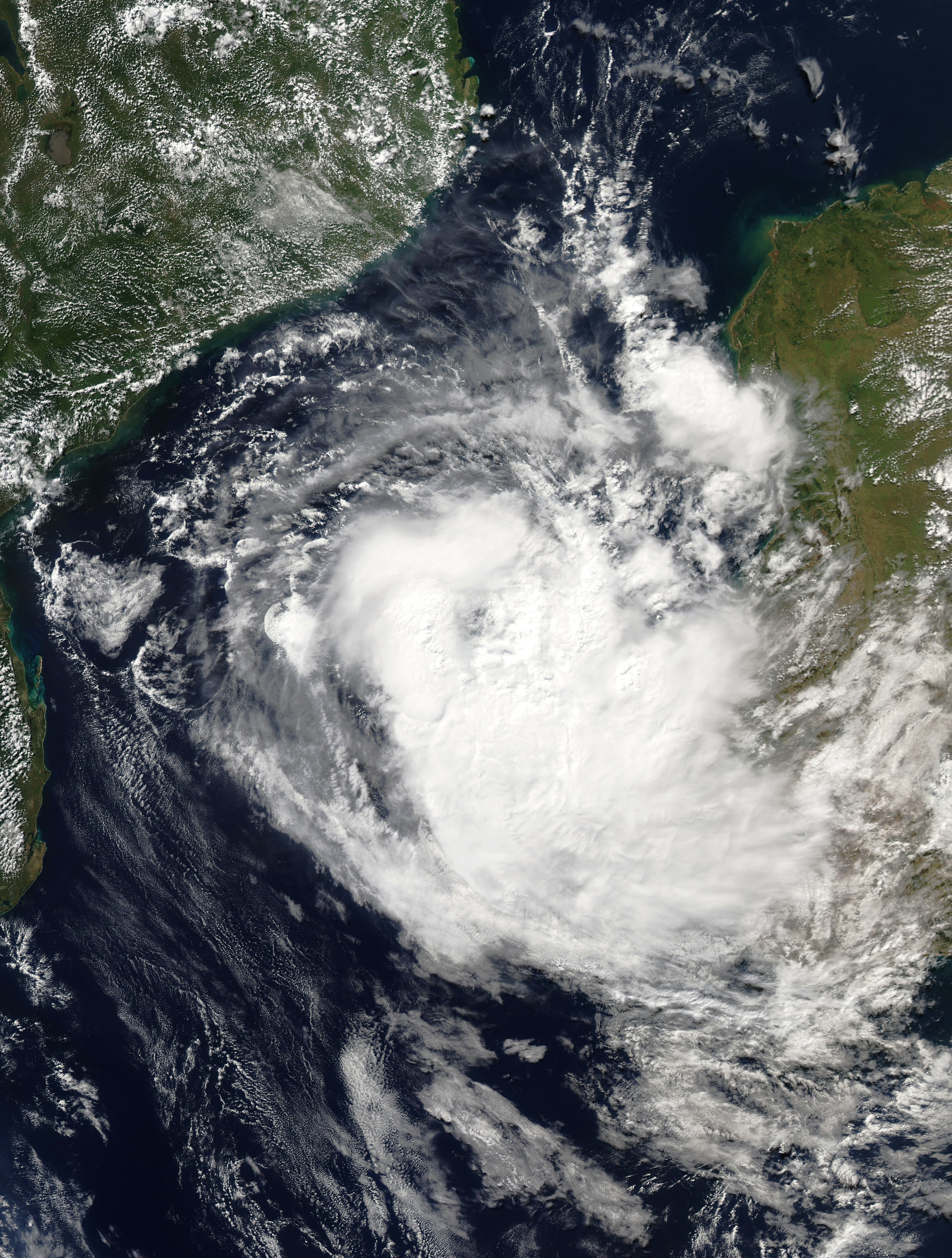
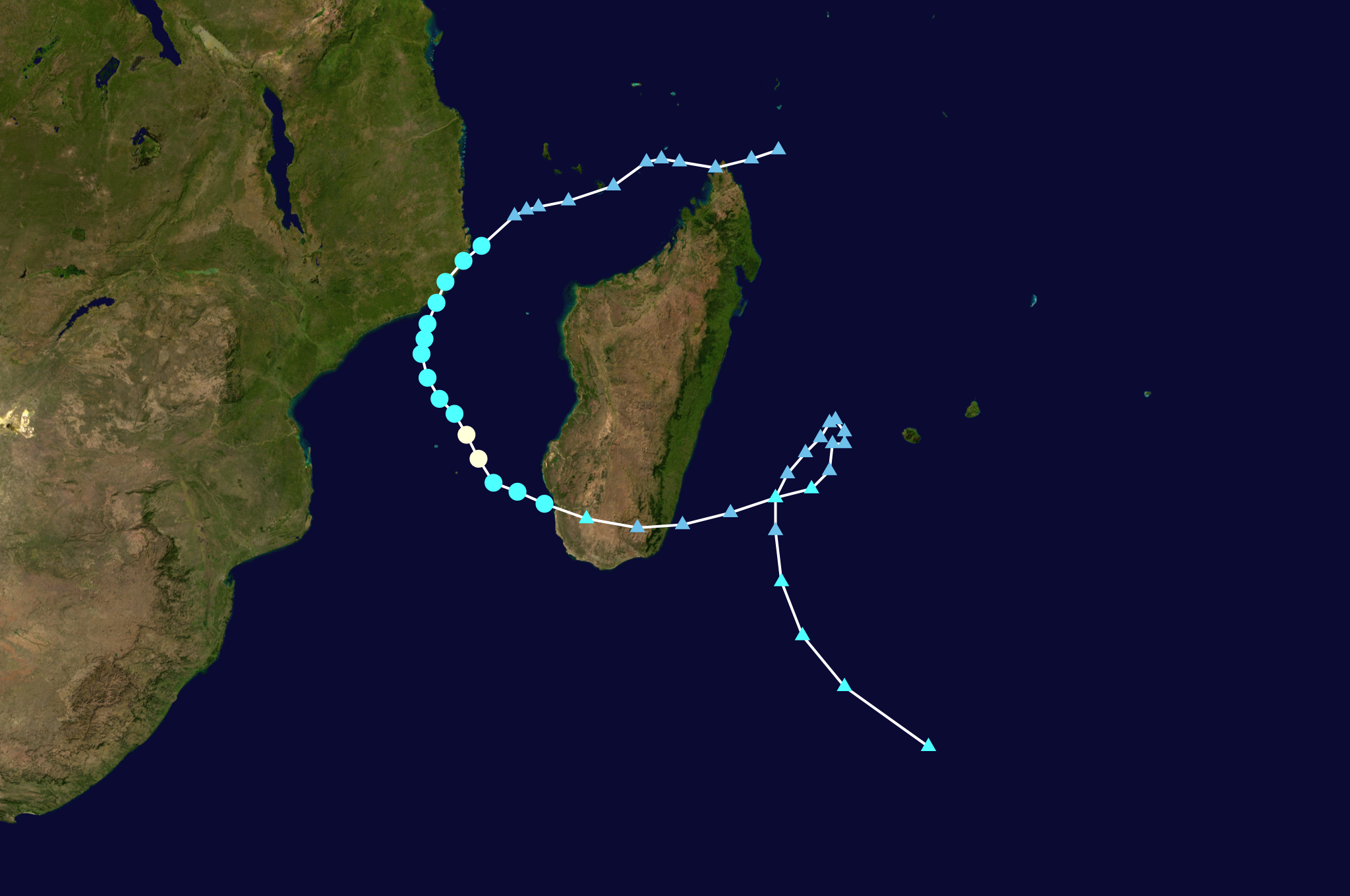
- Duration: 21 April – 27 April
- Peak intensity: 110 km/h (70 mph) (10-min); 985 hPa (mbar)

At 06:00 UTC on 22 April, the MFR released a bulletin detecting a weather disturbance zone near Comoros and it was designated 12. The system shifted and gained strength in the afternoon of the same day reaching "tropical disturbance" status. The JTWC also released an unofficial bulletin on the low-pressure system, designating it as Invest 97S. The cyclone made landfall in Nampula, off the coast of Mozambique. The storm reentered into the Mozambique channel two days later, it intensified and reached the status of "moderate tropical storm", thus earning the name Jasmine. It peaked as a Severe Tropical Storm with windspeed of 110 km/h according to MFR whereas the JTWC estimated a slightly lower windspeed of 100 km/h. Soon reaching its peak intensity, it began to encounter low sea surface temperatures as well as high wind shear and baroclinic forces which commenced its weakening. With the same intensity on 26 April, the storm made landfall at Toliara and the MFR downgraded it into an overland depression. On 27 April 2022, the MFR released a final bulletin, informing that Jasmine had lost its tropical characteristics and was downgraded to a low pressure common on the high seas.

As a result of Jasmine, three people have died, and seven more have been reported missing. Losses are estimated at US$1 million.

=== Moderate Tropical Storm Karim ===
- Moderate tropical storm (MFR)
- Tropical storm (SSHWS)
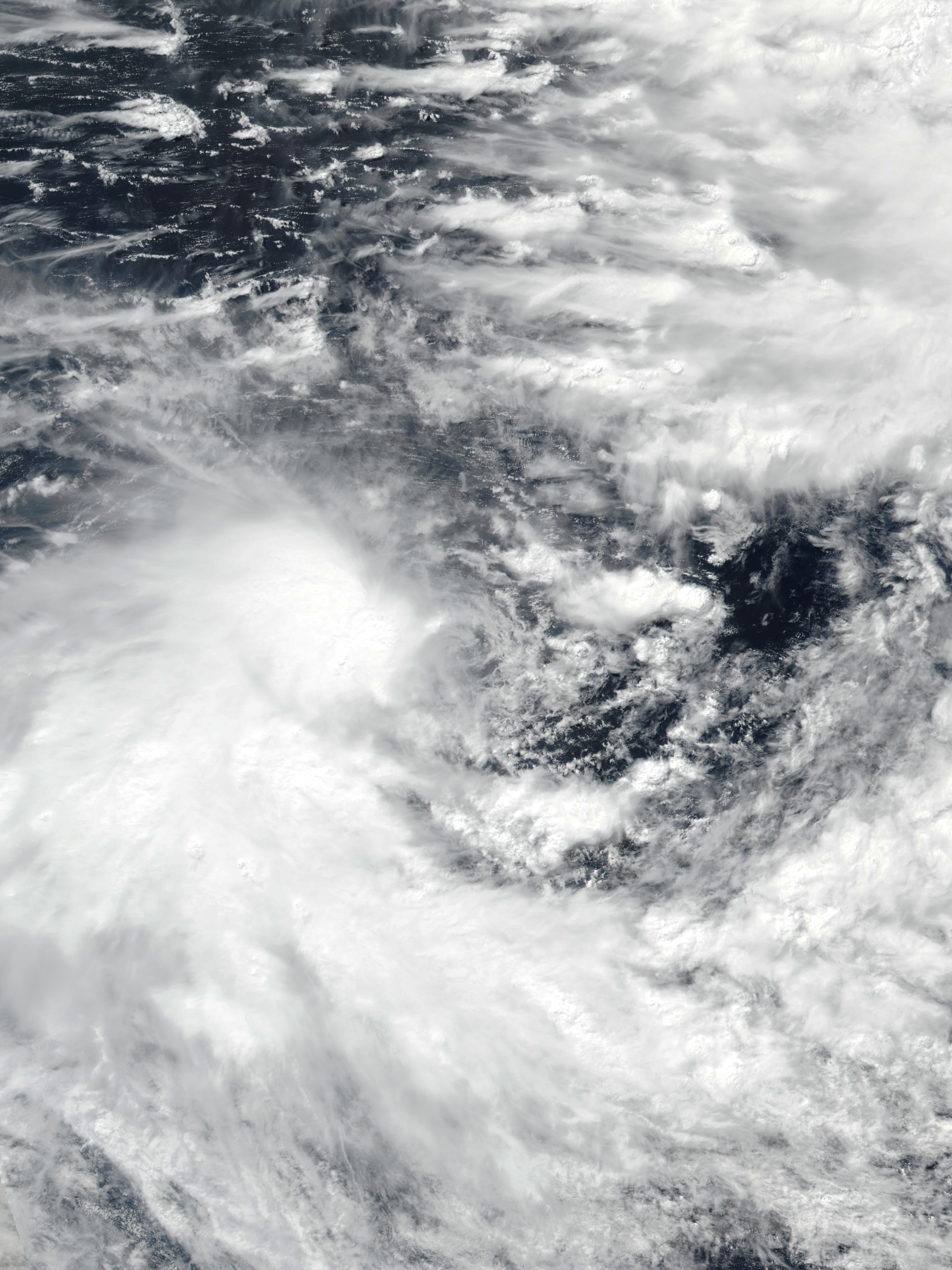
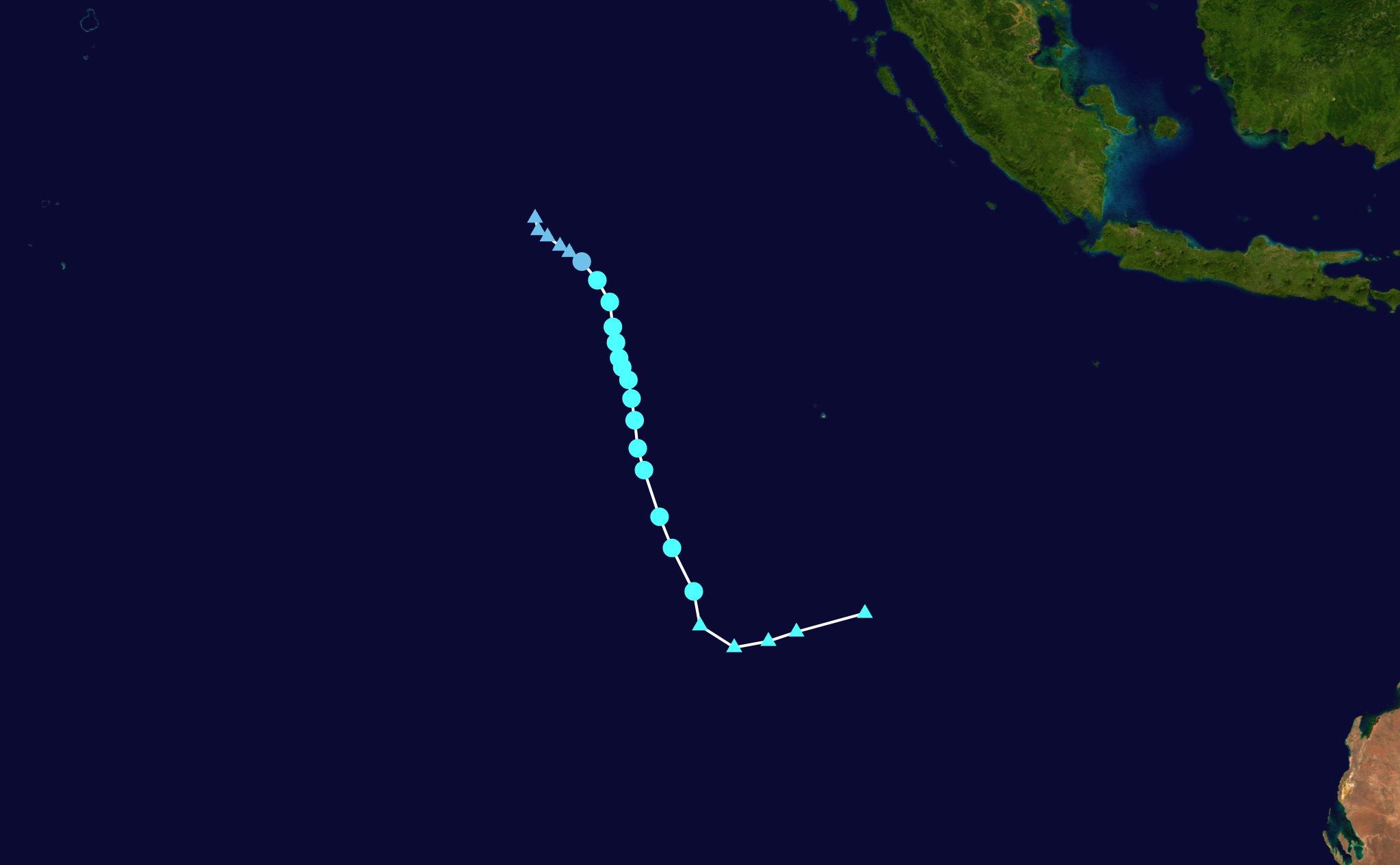
- Duration: 5 May – 7 May (Exited basin)
- Peak intensity: 75 km/h (45 mph) (10-min); 993 hPa (mbar)

During the first week of May, a strong pulse of the Madden–Julian oscillation (MJO), Kelvin wave and Equatorial Rossby wave (ERW) prevailed in the Indian Ocean. Along with a westerly wind burst occurring, this resulted in a formation of twin tropical cyclones on either side of the equator, with the first system being Severe Cyclonic Storm Asani within the North Indian Ocean that impacted India. The second tropical cyclone was first noted as a broad and weak circulation near the area of responsibility of TCWC Jakarta on 2 May. Over the next few days, the system struggled to organize due to lack of convergence in the equator side and northeasterly constraint aloft. On 5 May, the JTWC started to monitor the system, as it began organizing, with flaring deep convection wrapping to its broad low-level circulation center. With an environment of fair poleward outflow and warm sea surface temperatures offset by moderate wind shear, the system continued to organize, which led to the JTWC issuing a TCFA on the next day. The MFR subsequently initiated advisories on Zone of Disturbed Weather 13. It organized into a tropical disturbance by 7 May, before it intensified into a moderate tropical storm by 06:00 UTC that same day, with the MFR naming it Karim. The JTWC subsequently followed suit. Karim then exited the basin, and entered the Australian region that same day.

== Storm names ==
Within the South-West Indian Ocean, tropical depressions and subtropical depressions that are judged to have 10-minute sustained wind speeds of 65 km/h (40 mph) by the Regional Specialized Meteorological Center on Réunion island, France (RSMC La Réunion) are usually assigned a name. However, it is the Sub-Regional Tropical Cyclone Advisory Centers in Mauritius and Madagascar who name the systems. The Sub-Regional Tropical Cyclone Advisory Center (Mauritius Meteorological Services) in Mauritius names a storm should it intensify into a moderate tropical storm between 55°E and 90°E. If instead a cyclone intensifies into a moderate tropical storm between 30°E and 55°E then the Sub-Regional Tropical Cyclone Advisory Center (Madagascar Meteorological Services) in Madagascar assigns the appropriate name to the storm. Storm names are taken from three pre-determined lists of names, which rotate on a triennial basis, with any names that have been used automatically removed. Therefore, all storm names used this year will be removed from the rotation and replaced with a new name for the 2024–25 season, while the unused names will remain on the list. New names this season are: Ana, Batsirai, Cliff, Dumako, Emnati, Fezile, Gombe, Halima, Issa, Jasmine, Karim, and Letlama. They replaced Alcide, Bouchra, Cilida, Desmond, Eketsang, Funani, Gelena, Haleh, Idai, Joaninha, Kenneth, and Lorna after the 2018–19 season.

- Ana
- Batsirai
- Cliff
- Dumako
- Emnati
- Fezile
- Gombe
- Halima
- Issa
- Jasmine
- Karim
- Letlama (unused)
- Maipelo (unused)
- Njazi (unused)
- Oscar (unused)
- Pamela (unused)
- Quentin (unused)
- Rajab (unused)
- Savana (unused)
- Themba (unused)
- Uyapo (unused)
- Viviane (unused)
- Walter (unused)
- Xangy (unused)
- Yemurai (unused)
- Zanele (unused)

If a tropical cyclone enters the South-West Indian basin from the Australian region basin (west of 90°E), it will retain the name assigned to it by the Australian Bureau of Meteorology (BoM). The following storms were named in this manner:

- Vernon

After the season, the eleven names used were automatically retired and replaced with Ancha, Bheki, Chido, Dikeledi, Elvis, Faida, Garance, Honde, Ivone, Jude and Kanto, respectively for the 2024–25 season.

== Season effects ==
This table lists all of the tropical cyclones and subtropical cyclones that were monitored during the 2021–2022 South-West Indian Ocean cyclone season. Information on their intensity, duration, name, areas affected, primarily comes from RSMC La Réunion. Death and damage reports come from either press reports or the relevant national disaster management agency while the damage totals are given in 2021 or 2022 USD.

| Name | Dates | Peak intensity | | | Areas affected | Damage (USD) | Deaths | Ref(s). |
| Name | Dates | Category | Wind speed | Pressure | Areas affected | Damage (USD) | Deaths | Ref(s). |
|---|---|---|---|---|---|---|---|---|
| Ana | 20–25 January | Severe tropical storm | 95 km/h (60 mph) | 987 hPa (29.15 inHg) | Mascarene Islands, Madagascar, Southern Africa | $27 million | 142 | |
| Batsirai | 24 January – 8 February | Intense tropical cyclone | 205 km/h (125 mph) | 923 hPa (27.26 inHg) | Mauritius, Réunion, Madagascar | $200 million | 123 | |
| Cliff | 3–5 February | Moderate tropical storm | 85 km/h (50 mph) | 991 hPa (29.26 inHg) | None | None | None | |
| Dumako | 10–18 February | Moderate tropical storm | 85 km/h (50 mph) | 993 hPa (29.32 inHg) | Madagascar, Mozambique | $5 million | 14 | |
| Emnati | 15–24 February | Intense tropical cyclone | 175 km/h (110 mph) | 935 hPa (27.61 inHg) | Mauritius, Réunion, Madagascar | $54.4 million | 15 | |
| Fezile | 16–18 February | Severe tropical storm | 95 km/h (60 mph) | 978 hPa (28.88 inHg) | None | None | None | |
| Vernon | 26 February – 3 March | Intense tropical cyclone | 205 km/h (125 mph) | 940 hPa (27.76 inHg) | None | None | None | |
| 08 | 23–26 February | Moderate tropical storm | 75 km/h (45 mph) | 995 hPa (29.38 inHg) | None | None | None | |
| Gombe | 5–17 March | Tropical cyclone | 155 km/h (100 mph) | 955 hPa (28.20 inHg) | Madagascar, Mozambique, Malawi | $99 million | 72 | |
| Halima | 20 March – 1 April | Intense tropical cyclone | 195 km/h (120 mph) | 939 hPa (27.73 inHg) | None | None | None | |
| Issa | 12–13 April | Subtropical depression | 95 km/h (60 mph) | 993 hPa (29.32 inHg) | South Africa | None | None | |
| Jasmine | 21–27 April | Severe tropical storm | 110 km/h (70 mph) | 985 hPa (29.09 inHg) | Comoros, Mozambique, Madagascar | $1 million | 10 | |
| Karim | 5–7 May | Moderate tropical storm | 75 km/h (45 mph) | 993 hPa (29.32 inHg) | None | None | None | |
Season aggregates
| 13 systems | 20 January – 7 May | | 205 km/h (125 mph) | 923 hPa (27.26 inHg) | | $380 million | 376 | |

== See also ==
- Weather of 2021 and 2022
- List of Southern Hemisphere cyclone seasons
- Tropical cyclones in 2021 and 2022
- Atlantic hurricane seasons: 2021, 2022
- Pacific hurricane seasons: 2021, 2022
- Pacific typhoon seasons: 2021, 2022
- North Indian Ocean cyclone seasons: 2021, 2022
- 2021–22 Australian region cyclone season
- 2021–22 South Pacific cyclone season
