= Cyclone Emnati =

Tropical cyclone in the Indian Ocean in 2022

Intense Tropical Cyclone Emnati
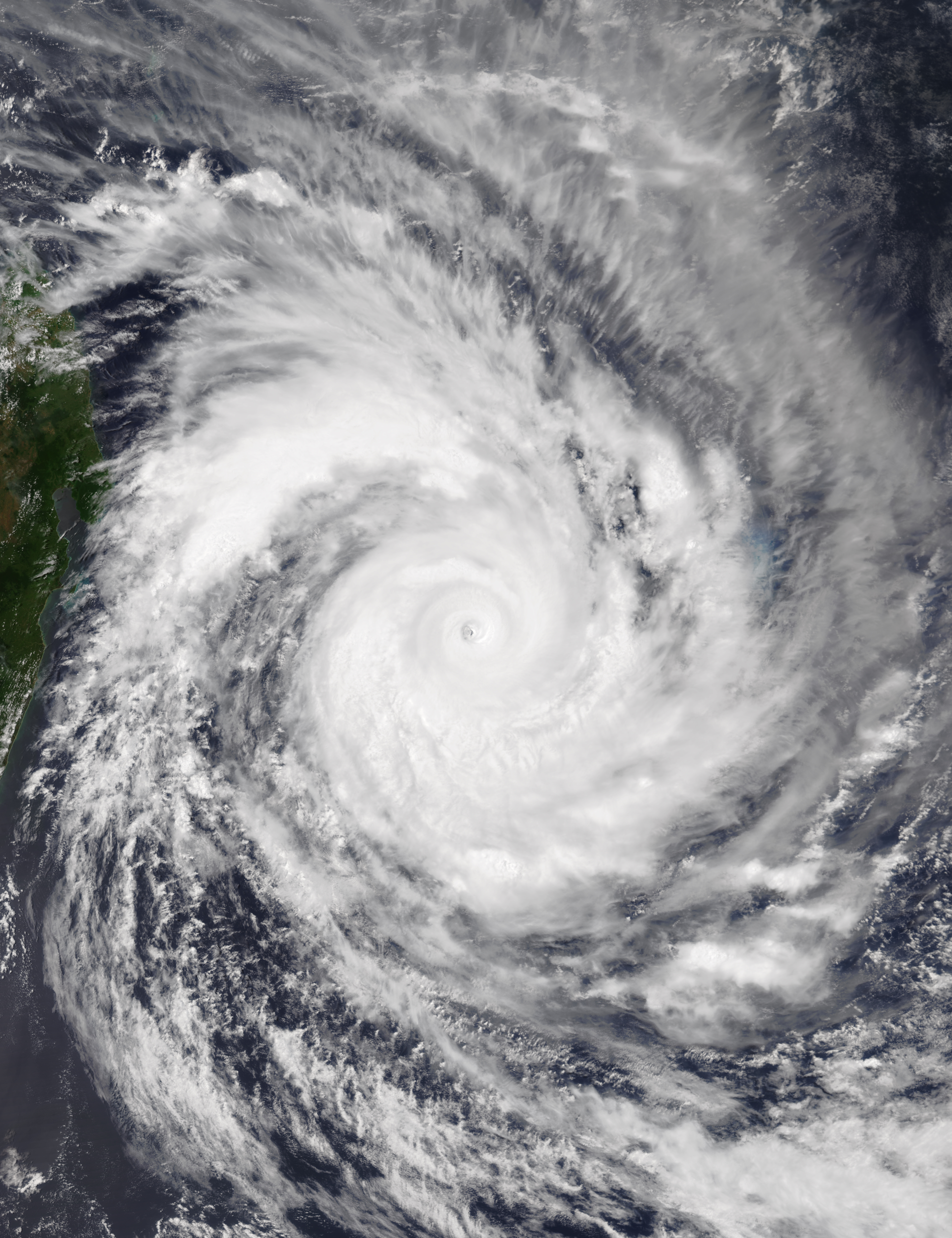
- Cyclone Emnati at peak intensity on 20 February.

Meteorological history
- Formed: 15 February 2022
- Dissipated: 26 February 2022

Intense tropical cyclone
- 10-minute sustained (MFR)
- Highest winds: 175 km/h (110 mph)
- Lowest pressure: 935 hPa (mbar); 27.61 inHg

Category 4-equivalent tropical cyclone
- 1-minute sustained (SSHWS/JTWC)
- Highest winds: 215 km/h (130 mph)
- Lowest pressure: 941 hPa (mbar); 27.79 inHg

Overall effects
- Fatalities: 15 total
- Damage: $54.4 million (2022 USD)
- Areas affected: Mauritius, Réunion, Madagascar
- Part of the 2021–22 South-West Indian Ocean cyclone season

Intense Tropical Cyclone Emnati was a tropical cyclone that affected Madagascar, only two weeks after Cyclone Batsirai. The sixth tropical disturbance, the second tropical cyclone, and the second intense tropical cyclone of the 2021–22 South-West Indian Ocean cyclone season, Emnati formed from a zone of disturbed weather that was first noted on 15 February 2022. It continued westward, and steadily intensified before getting named Emnati a day later. Due to present dry air and wind shear, the storm had struggled to intensify significantly, and it became a category 1-equivalent on the Saffir-Simpson Scale later. After it managed to close off its core from prohibiting factors, the storm quickly intensified into a category 4-equivalent days later, forming a small eye around its CDO. Emnati then underwent a lengthy eyewall replacement cycle, which strongly weakened the storm as it moved closer to Madagascar. Eventually, it weakened back to a category 1-equivalent cyclone before making landfall in the country.

== Meteorological history ==
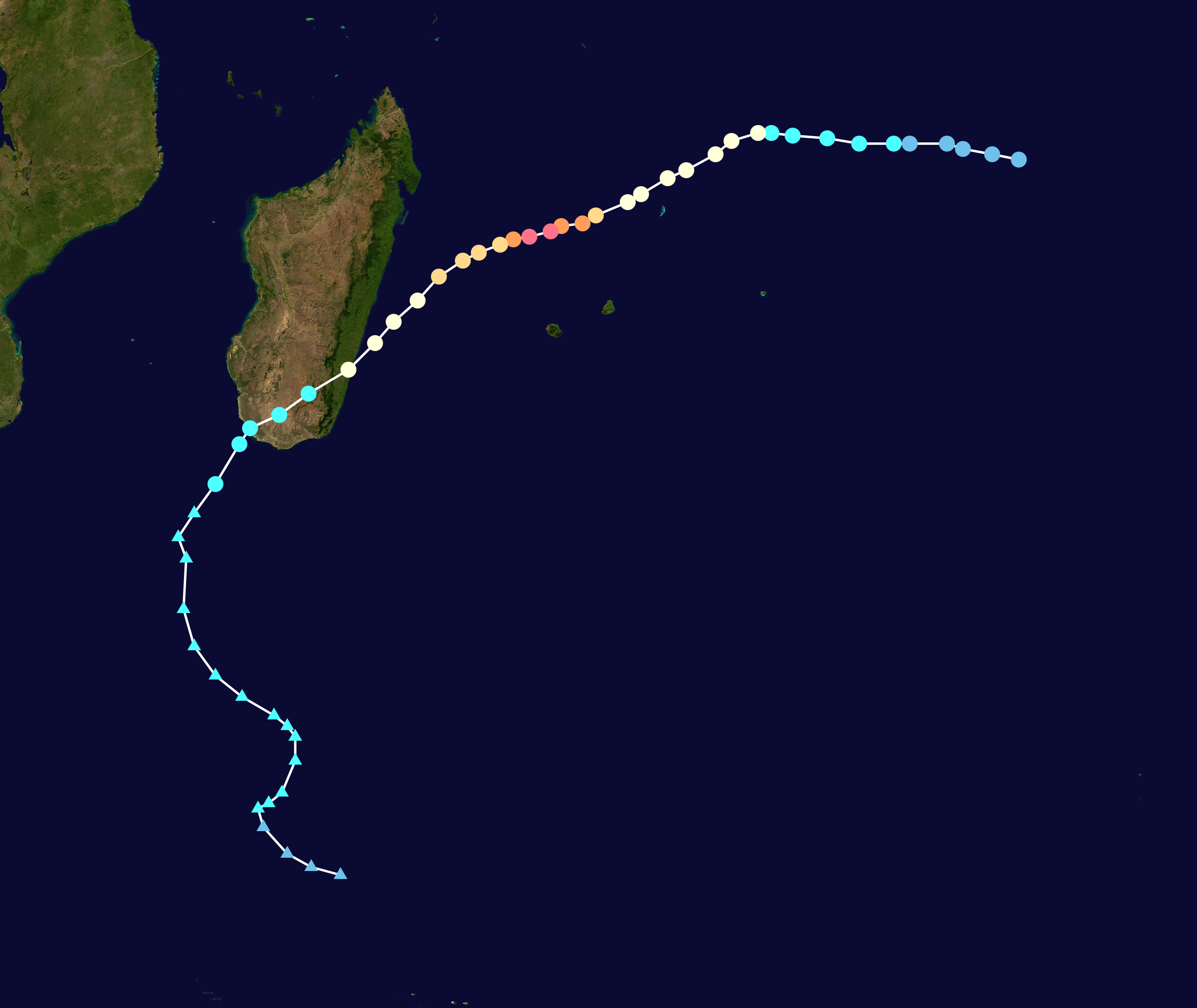
Map plotting the storm's track and intensity, according to the Saffir–Simpson scale Map key Saffir–Simpson scale Tropical depression (≤38 mph, ≤62 km/h) Tropical storm (39–73 mph, 63–118 km/h) Category 1 (74–95 mph, 119–153 km/h) Category 2 (96–110 mph, 154–177 km/h) Category 3 (111–129 mph, 178–208 km/h) Category 4 (130–156 mph, 209–251 km/h) Category 5 (≥157 mph, ≥252 km/h) Unknown Storm type Tropical cyclone Subtropical cyclone Extratropical cyclone, remnant low, tropical disturbance, or monsoon depression

Emnati initially developed as a zone of disturbed weather where it moved westward over the open waters in the Indian Ocean. Environmental conditions were assessed as being marginally conducive for tropical cyclogenesis, with warm sea surface temperatures near 28 °C (82 °F) and low vertical wind, with the disturbance located about 420 nautical miles (780 km; 480 mi) to Diego Garcia south. On the same day, the JTWC issued a Tropical Cyclone Formation Alert on the system and by 21:00 UTC JTWC subsequently initiated advisories on the system and classified it Tropical Cyclone 13S. The next day, the system organized into a tropical disturbance. The system continued organizing, and at 12:00 UTC, MFR upgraded the system to a tropical depression. By the 17th of February, the Météo-France La Réunion (MFR) (Note: Météo-France's meteorological office in Réunion (MFR) is the official Regional Specialized Meteorological Center for the South-West Indian Ocean, tracking all tropical cyclones south of the equator, from the east coast of Africa to 90° E.) reported that the system had become a moderate tropical storm and the Sub-Regional Tropical Cyclone Advisory Center in Mauritius named it Emnati. On February 18, at 00:00 UTC the MFR marked Cyclone Emnati as a Severe Tropical Storm. Just three hours later, the JTWC upgraded Emnati to a Category 1 tropical cyclone on the Saffir–Simpson scale (SSHWS). Due to more favorable conditions, the Emnati intensified to a tropical cyclone. One day later, classified by JTWC as a category 2 tropical cyclone. At 12:00 UTC, February 20, the cyclone reached its peak intensity as the JTWC upgraded to a category 4 tropical cyclone. The cyclone then weakened slowly due to an eyewall replacement cycle, and made landfall on February 23 as a category 1 tropical cyclone over Madagascar. Late on February 24, the JTWC issued their final warning on the system.

== Preparations ==
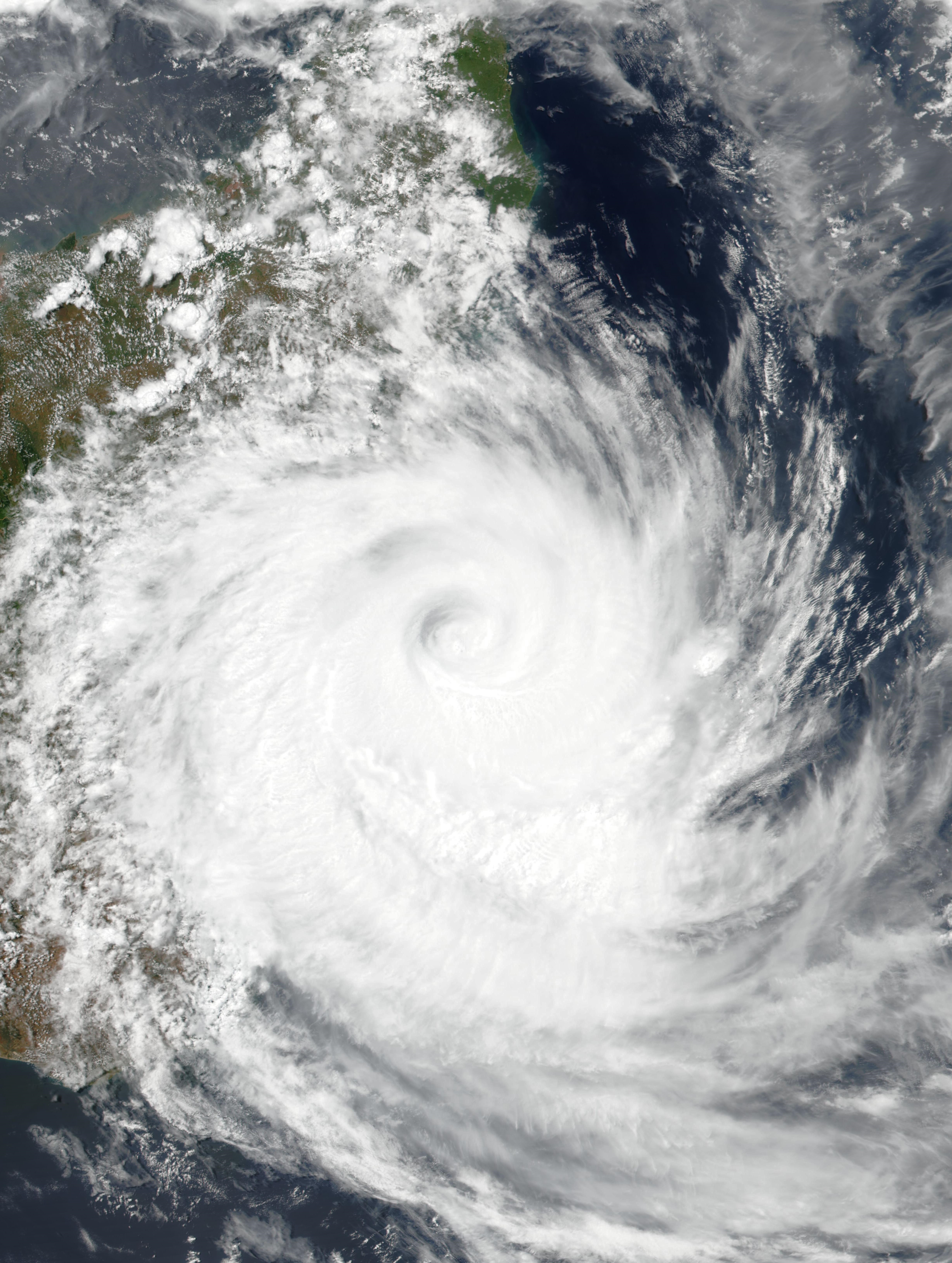
Cyclone Emnati approaching Madagascar on 22 February

=== Mauritius ===
A Class 4 warning was issued as the storm passed north of the island.

=== Réunion ===
A Red alert was declared in Réunion Island.

=== Madagascar ===
Red, yellow, and green alerts were issued as the cyclone neared the island. Saturated grounds from Batsirai's effects earlier were expected to worsen potential rainfall damages. Very heavy rain was forecasted, with over 400–500 m (16,000–20,000 in) falling in the projected landfall area. Flash flooding, and mudslides were warned. A dire humanitarian situation in Madagascar was feared to worsen with Emnati's arrival. In response to the cyclone's passing, the IFRC had sought additional funds for relief efforts. The Secretary General of Malagasy Red Cross said the storm was a "double tragedy". Humanitarian partners and other response teams were placed on Madagascar to help after the storm's landfall. Stocks of food and non-food items were also saved for those affected, mostly pre-positioned in Mananjary and Manakara. Planes and boats were also identified to help facilitate rapid damage assessments. Floodwaters from various areas of 4-8 inch rainfall were expected to be accentuated by Madagascar's mountainous terrain as well, and storm surge and wind impacts were feared to be widespread. More than 30,000 people were moved to safety areas prior to landfall.

== Impact ==
=== Mauritius ===
Electric wires and trees were pulled out of the ground in some places. Gusts of 67 mph (108 km/h) were recorded on the island, along with some flooding and toppled structures.

=== Réunion ===
Heavy rain caused flooding in many coastal areas. No deaths have been reported, and overall effects and damage was less than anticipated. 7,000 homes were out of power when the storm passed, and 3,400 suffered water cuts. Schools closed on 21 February due to the cyclone, as well as several roads.

=== Madagascar ===
The storm had struck the country only 18 days after Batsirai.

Emnati made landfall in the country on midnight, 22 February, with winds of 84 mph (135 km/h). As of now, there have been 15 reported deaths from the storm in Madagascar. Houses flooded, and the roofs of houses were said to be torn off. Electricity and water was also cut off from several communities. A gendarmerie in Fitovinany recorded 624 damaged huts. More than 2,000 houses were damaged in Manakara, and 70 to 80 percent of Farafangana was estimated to be destroyed by Emnati; with witnesses detailing destroyed buildings, accommodation centers damaged, and roads being cut off. Communities within Vohipeno and Midongy-Atsimo districts were inundated by Emnati due to nearby rivers flooding. 44,000 people were displaced. A 10-meter (33-foot) stretch of road was washed away by heavy rain. The threat of a famine was feared to be worsened due to Emnati's effects on agriculture. Tropical cyclone model from the African Risk Capacity estimated the damage of Emnati at US$54.4 million.

== See also ==
- Tropical cyclones in 2022
- Weather of 2022
- List of South-West Indian Ocean intense tropical cyclones
- Tropical cyclones in the Mascarene Islands
- Cyclone Manou (2003) – took a similar path and rare May tropical cyclone that affected Madagascar.
- Cyclone Giovanna (2012) – took a similar path
- Cyclone Ivan (2008) – a powerful tropical cyclone that struck Madagascar in February 2008.
- Cyclone Batsirai (2022) — another powerful cyclone that impacted Madagascar just three weeks prior.
- Tropical Storm Dumako (2022)
