= 2022 North Indian Ocean cyclone season =

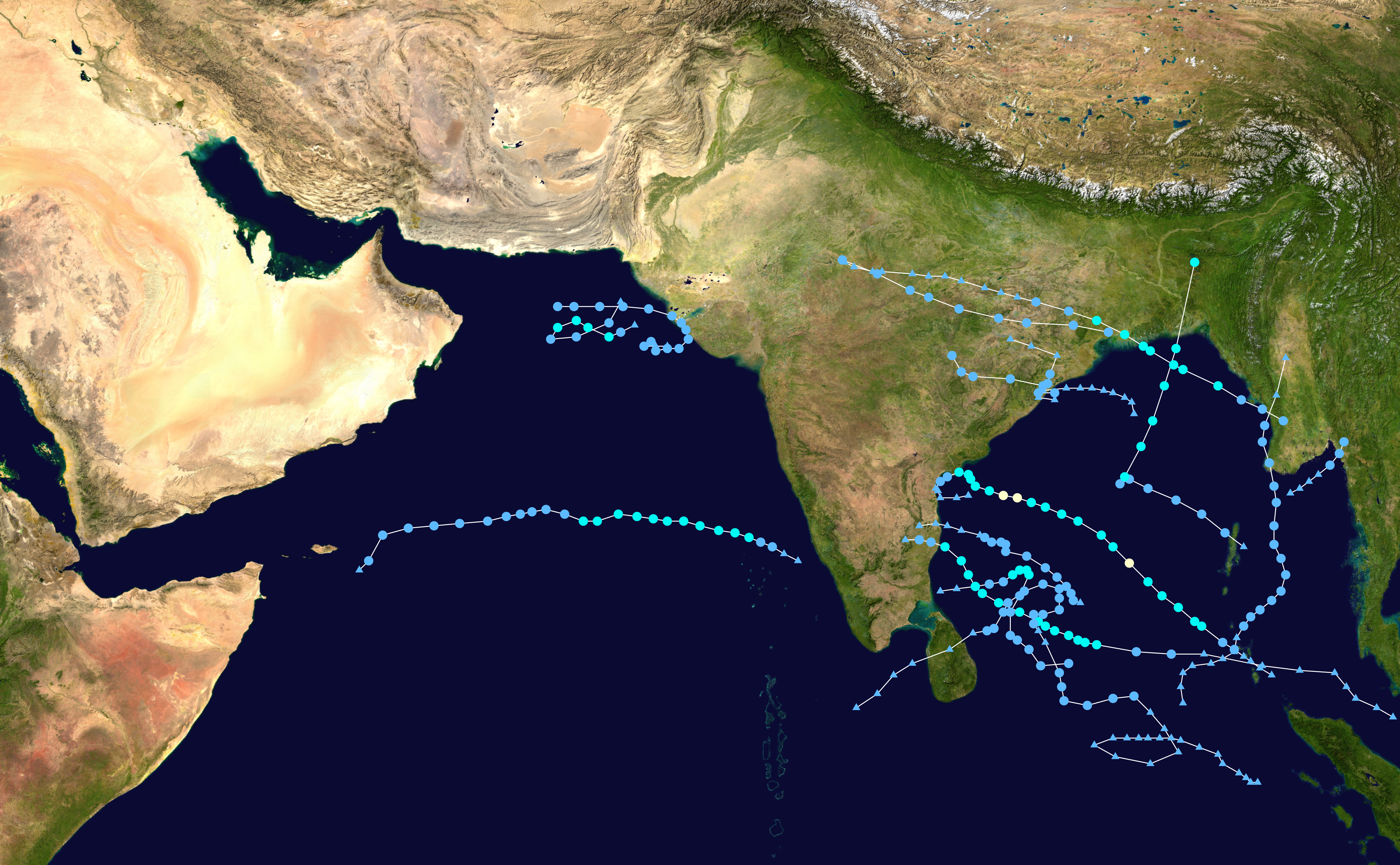
- Season summary map

Seasonal boundaries
- First system formed: 3 March 2022
- Last system dissipated: 27 December 2022

Strongest storm
- Name: Asani
  - Maximum winds: 100 km/h (65 mph) (3-minute sustained)
  - Lowest pressure: 982 hPa (mbar)

Seasonal statistics
- Depressions: 15
- Deep depressions: 7
- Cyclonic storms: 3
- Severe cyclonic storms: 2
- Total fatalities: 79 total
- Total damage: $471 million (2022 USD)

Related articles
- 2022 Atlantic hurricane season; 2022 Pacific hurricane season; 2022 Pacific typhoon season

The 2022 North Indian Ocean cyclone season was an above-average season in terms of depressions and average in terms of deep depressions, but slightly below average in terms of cyclonic storms. It was also the least deadly North Indian Ocean cyclone season since 1988, according to official data. The season's strongest tropical cyclone was Cyclone Asani, with maximum wind speeds of 100 km/h (65 mph) and a minimum barometric pressure of 982 hPa (29.00 inHg). The North Indian Ocean cyclone season has no official bounds, but cyclones tend to form between April and December, with the peak from May to November. These dates conventionally delimit the period of each year when most tropical cyclones form in the northern Indian Ocean.

The scope of this article is limited to the Indian Ocean in the Northern Hemisphere, east of the Horn of Africa and west of the Malay Peninsula. There are two main seas in the North Indian Ocean — the Arabian Sea to the west of the Indian subcontinent, abbreviated ARB by the India Meteorological Department (IMD); and the Bay of Bengal to the east, abbreviated BOB by the IMD. The systems that form over land are abbreviated as LAND. The official Regional Specialized Meteorological Centre in this basin is the India Meteorological Department (IMD), while the Joint Typhoon Warning Center (JTWC) releases unofficial advisories. On average, three to four cyclonic storms form in this basin every season.

== Season summary ==
The season began with BOB 01 which formed on 3 March over the Bay of Bengal. It peaked as a deep depression, before weakening as a well-marked low-pressure area on 6 March. The system became the eighth system to form in March since reliable records began in 1891. On 20 March, another deep depression classified as BOB 02 formed in the Andaman Sea. BOB 02 made landfall in Myanmar before dissipating. After more than 1 month of inactivity, a low-pressure system formed off the coast of Andaman and Nicobar Islands on 6 May. On the next day, JTWC classified it as Tropical Cyclone 02B, followed by IMD which recognized it as Depression BOB 03. The depression intensified into a cyclonic storm, named Asani, making it the first named storm in the season. Soon, Asani was upgraded to Category 1 cyclone by JTWC, and IMD upgraded to a severe cyclonic storm. Afterward, Asani began to weaken rapidly due to high wind shear. and made landfall in Andhra Pradesh as a deep depression. Later in May, BOB 04 quickly consolidated into a depression as it landed on the south Burmese coast.

Activity ceased for approximately 2 months before Depression ARB 01 was designated and struggled against strong wind shear and dry air intrusions. In August, four systems were designated by the IMD. Land Depression 01 was short-lived and degenerated to a remnant low over Chhattisgarh. Depression ARB 02 formed a couple of days later and even though the IMD kept the system as a depression, the JTWC upgraded ARB 02 to Tropical Cyclone 03A. Having a tropical storm-force cyclone form in the Arabian Sea in August is rare, and the last system to become one was Cyclone Aurora in 1983. Depression BOB 05 followed and the brown ocean effect aided the system to maintain depression status for a few more days. After BOB 05, Deep Depression BOB 06 was designated by the IMD after the JTWC unofficially upgraded it to Tropical Cyclone 04B due to attaining tropical storm-force winds. BOB 06 later made landfall in Digha, West Bengal and caused 32 deaths. In September, the IMD briefly designated Land Depression 02.

In late October, the IMD monitored an area of low pressure, which was designated as BOB 07 and later became Cyclonic Storm Sitrang, officially the second named storm of the season. The cyclonic storm abruptly headed north-northeast and early on October 24, it made landfall in Patuakhali, Bangladesh. Sitrang is the first tropical cyclone to hit Bangladesh since Cyclone Mora in 2017, and caused 35 fatalities. After Sitrang, Depression BOB 08 formed and struggled to consolidate a well-defined center before causing minor impacts to parts of southern India. In December, Deep Depression BOB 09 formed. IMD later upgraded it to Cyclonic Storm Mandous. Despite moderate easterly mid-level wind shear, Mandous intensified to a Severe Cyclonic Storm as it neared Sri Lanka. It made landfall near Chennai, India, as a Deep Depression and caused 9 deaths. The remnants of Mandous transferred across southern India and into the Arabian Sea. The system quickly developed and was designated as Depression ARB 03 by IMD. The storm unexpectedly rapidly developed and the JTWC designated it as Tropical Cyclone 07A, peaking with winds of 60 mph (95 km/h). After ARB 03, Depression BOB 10 formed and meandered in the Bay of Bengal before dissipating.

== Systems ==
=== Deep Depression BOB 01 ===
- Deep depression (IMD)
- Tropical storm (SSHWS)
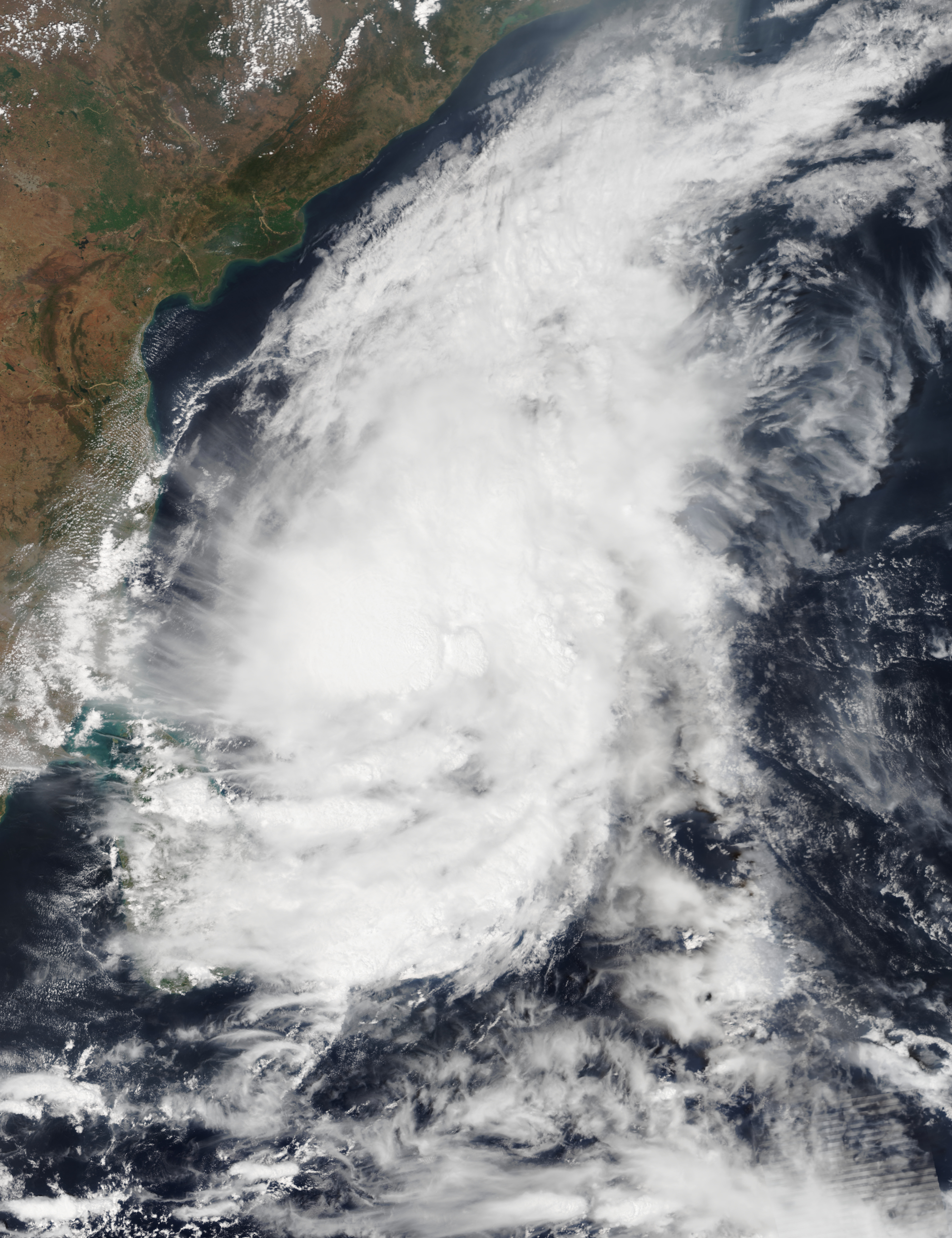
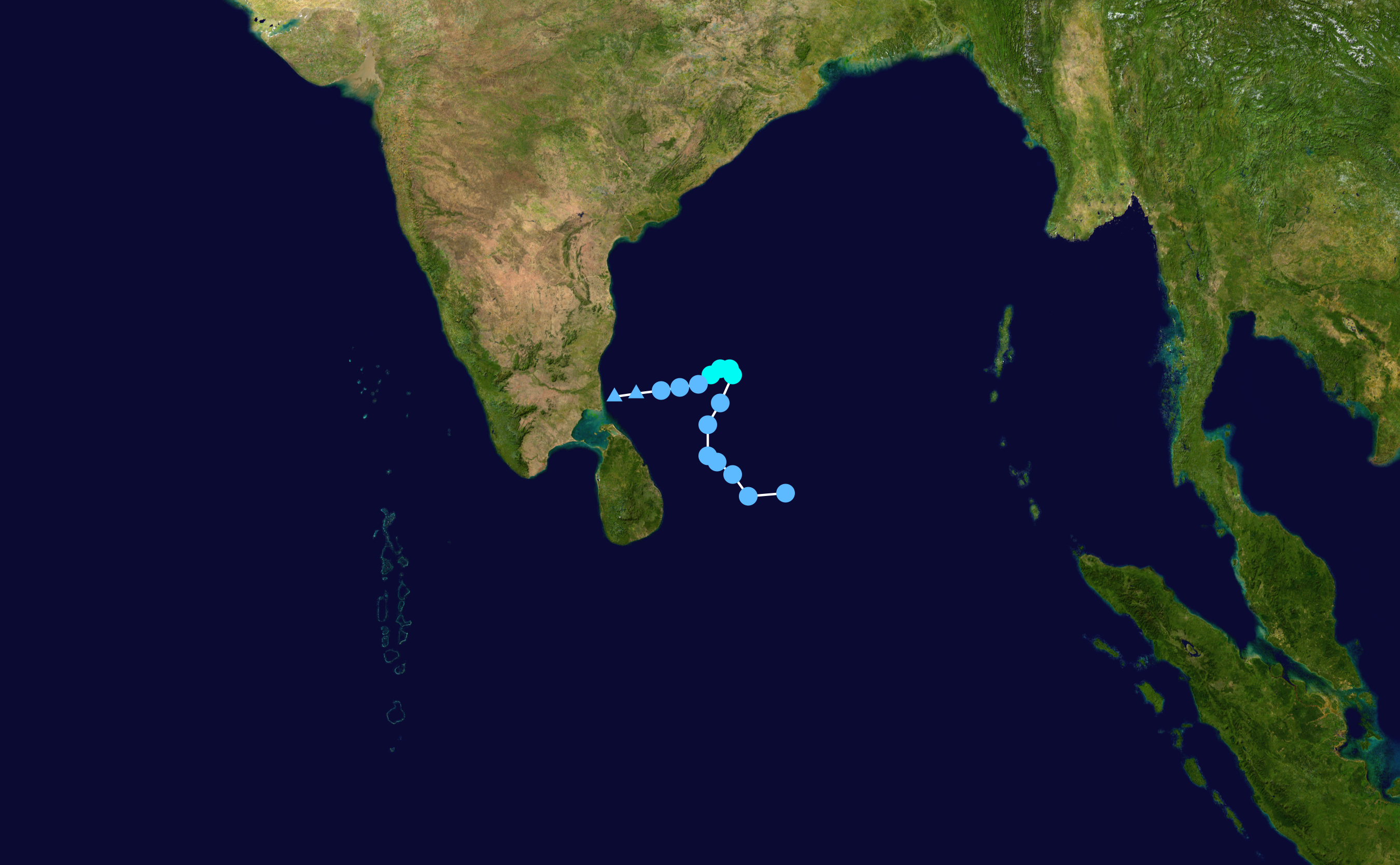
- Duration: 3 March – 6 March
- Peak intensity: 55 km/h (35 mph) (3-min); 1002 hPa (mbar)

Towards the end of February, a cyclonic circulation formed over the Strait of Malacca and the adjoining Andaman Sea, which later intensified into a low pressure area on midday (17:30 IST) of 28 February, as the disturbance formed a low-level circulation, according to a INSAT-3D satellite imagery. Early the next day, at 09:00 UTC (14:30 IST), the disturbance further intensified into a well-marked low pressure area, as it developed a defined cyclonic vortex, and three-and-a-half-hour later, the United States-based Joint Typhoon Warning Center (JTWC) started monitoring the same disturbance as Invest 90B. On 3 March of midnight (05:30 IST), the well-marked low organized to a depression and the India Meteorological Department (IMD) identified the system as BOB 01, making it the first system of the season. This intensification was possible because of a favourable Madden–Julian oscillation (MJO) phase, along with a feeble easterlies outflow. Additionally, sea surface temperatures (SST) of 27–28 °C (81–82 °F) were warm enough for tropical cyclogenesis to take place, along with moderate to high vertical wind shear. During the next day, the JTWC issued a Tropical Cyclone Formation Alert (TCFA) on the system. The depression subsequently intensified into a deep depression, and by 21:00 UTC (02:30 IST), the JTWC started initiating advisories for Tropical Cyclone 01B. After maintaining its intensity for a day, the JTWC issued its last warning for the system, at 15:00 UTC (20:30 IST) as the increasing dry air had weakened its convective mass. The IMD subsequently weakened back to a depression due to the same reason. On 6 March, the IMD issued its last advisory for the system and downgraded it to a well-marked low pressure area, as its convective mass got further disorganized by the wind shear.

=== Deep Depression BOB 02 ===
- Deep depression (IMD)
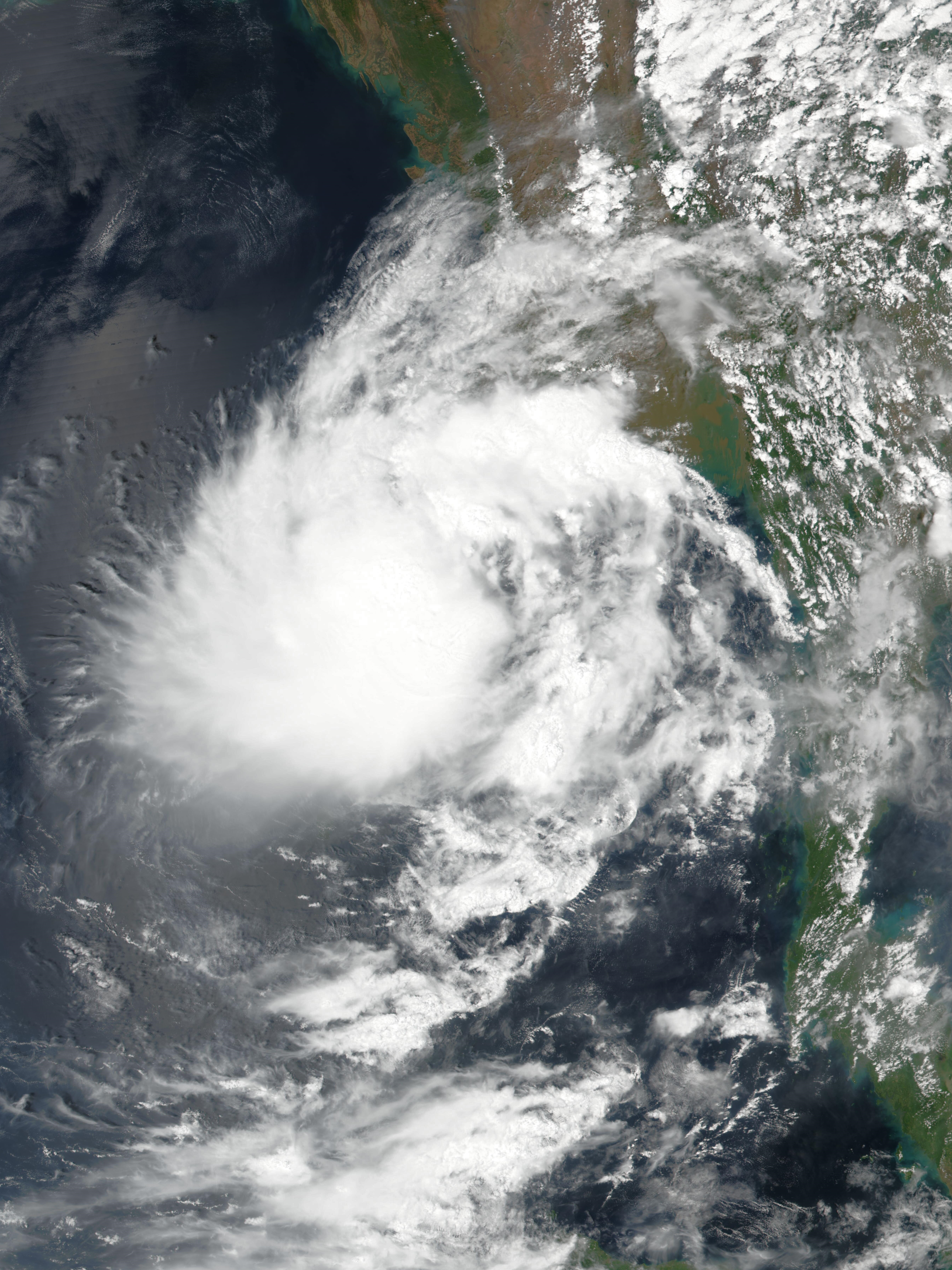
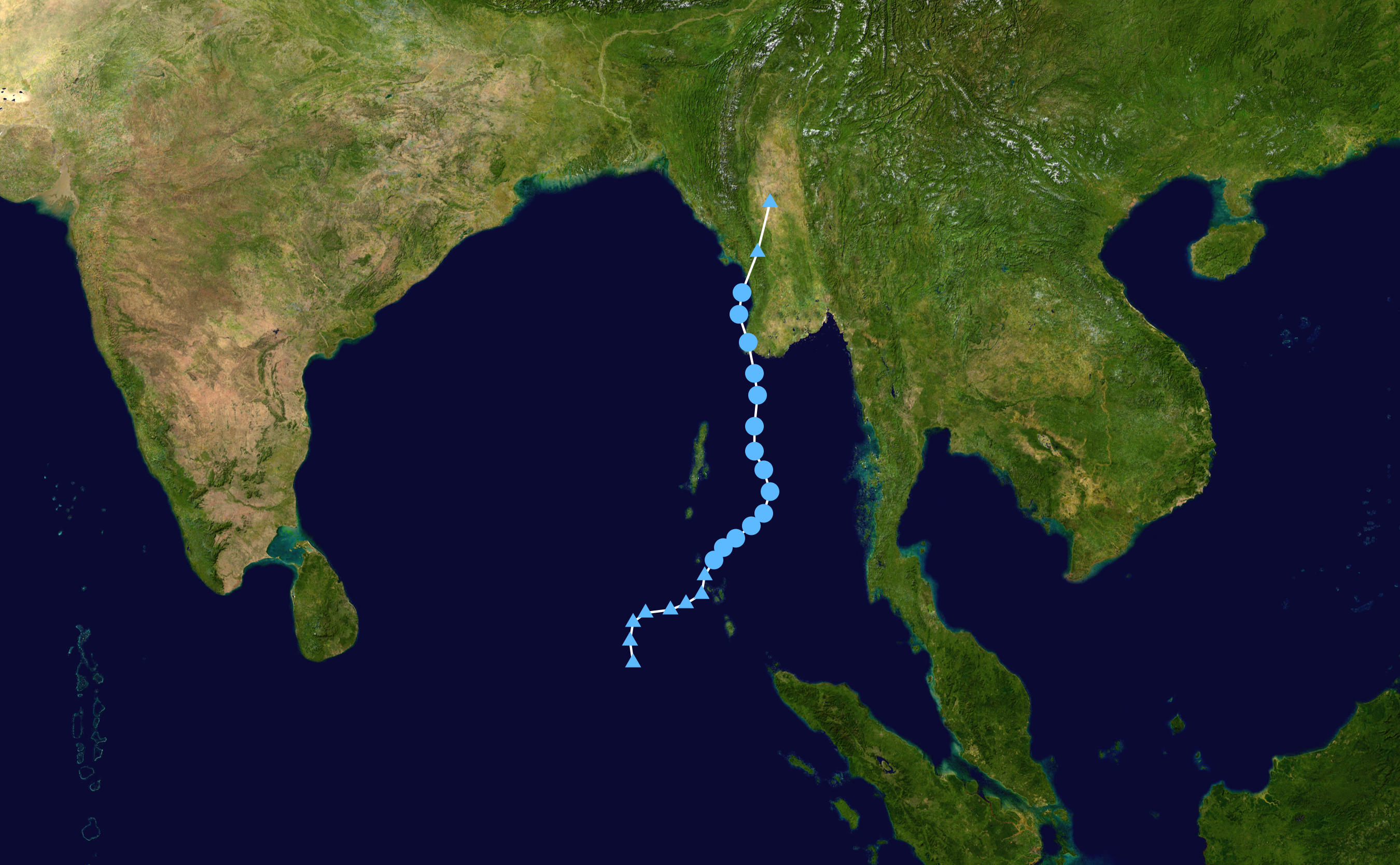
- Duration: 20 March – 23 March
- Peak intensity: 55 km/h (35 mph) (3-min); 1000 hPa (mbar)

In mid-March, a low-pressure area formed in the southwest Bay of Bengal, offshore of Sri Lanka, which later intensified into a well marked low pressure area, and the JTWC started monitoring the disturbance as Invest 91B. It meandered east-southeast for three days, and on 20 March, the IMD reported that a depression formed over the Bay of Bengal, giving it the designation BOB 02. On that day, the JTWC issued a TCFA for the system. The system gradually intensified, into a deep depression by 00:00 UTC (05:30 IST) the next day, as the convection had further organized favorable conditions such as moderate to high sea-surface temperatures. On 22 March, the JTWC cancelled the TCFA due to the land interaction in Myanmar until the landfall. BOB 02 rapidly weakened overland, degenerating into a depression and by 03:00 UTC (08:30 IST) the next day the system weakened into a well-marked low pressure area and IMD issued last advisory.

=== Severe Cyclonic Storm Asani ===
- Severe cyclonic storm (IMD)
- Category 1 tropical cyclone (SSHWS)
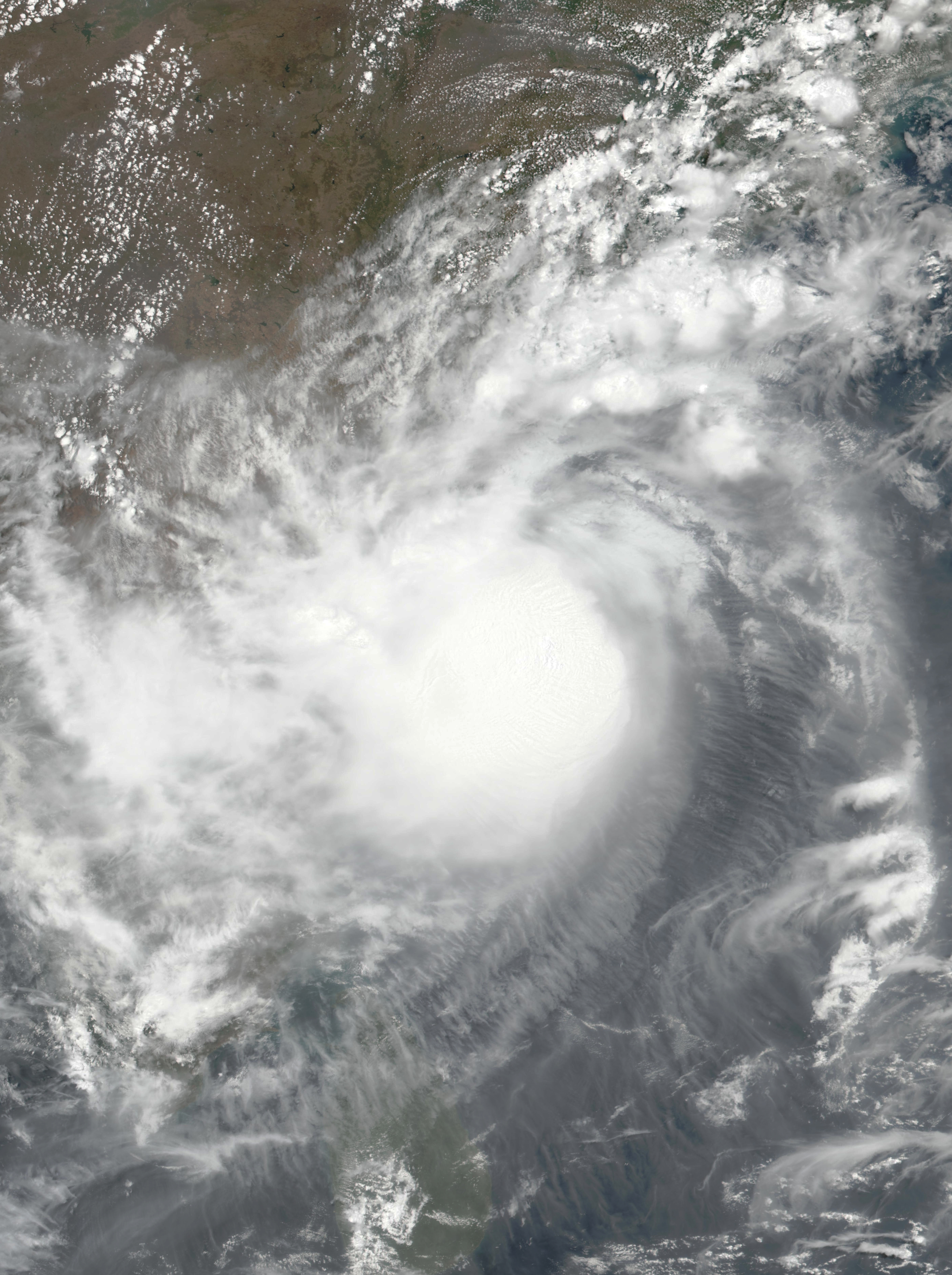
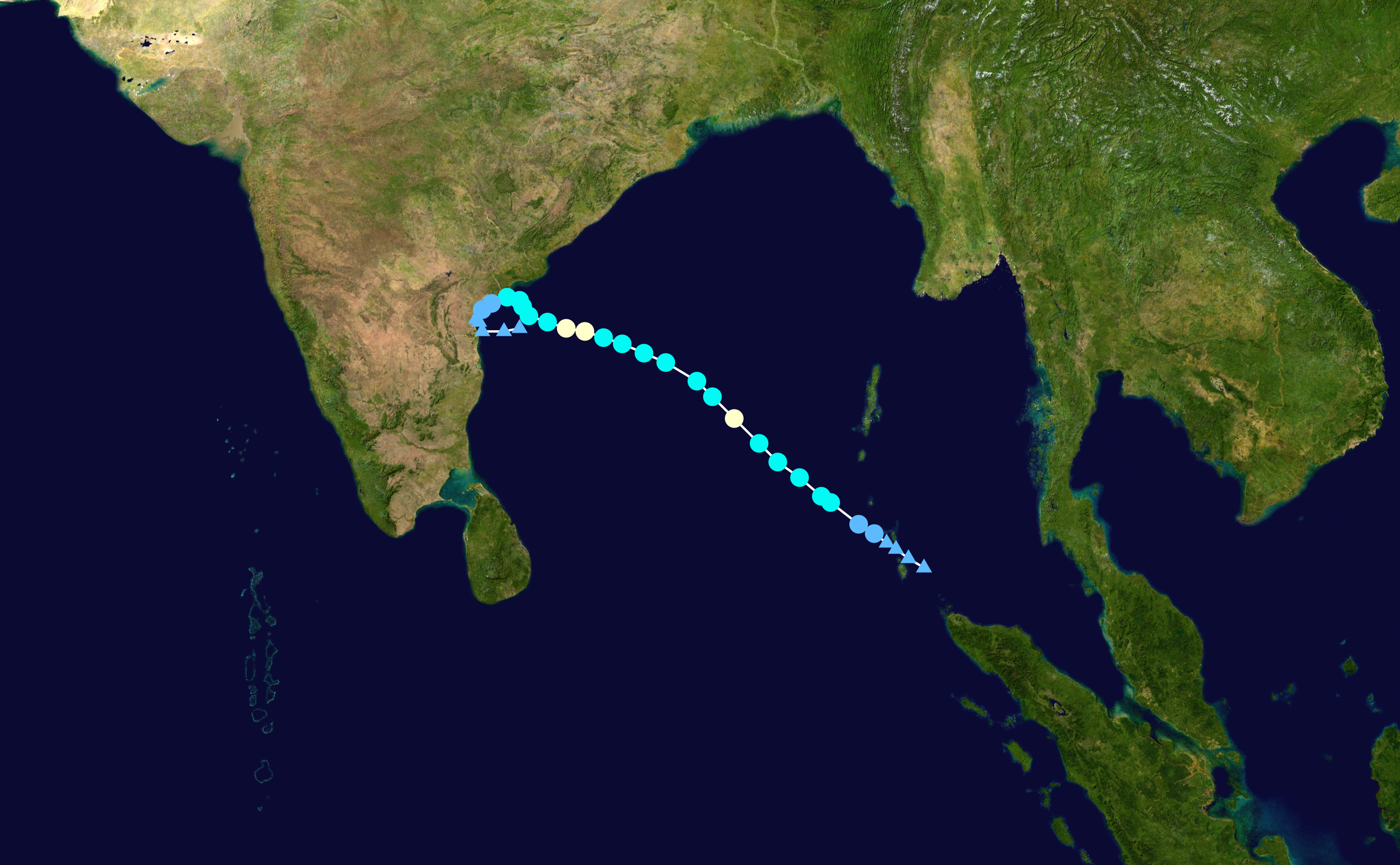
- Duration: 7 May – 12 May
- Peak intensity: 100 km/h (65 mph) (3-min); 982 hPa (mbar)

During the first week of May, a strong pulse of Madden-Julian Oscillation (MJO) and Equatorial Rossby wave (ERW) prevailed in this basin. These two conditions led to a cyclonic circulation forming over the southern Andaman Sea on 4 May. At the same time, a Westerly wind burst occurred on the same day which resulted in formation of twin cyclones over the either side of the Indian Ocean. The southern hemisphere counterpart being Tropical Cyclone Karim and the northern hemisphere counterpart being this cyclonic circulation. The JTWC followed suit and designated it as Invest 92B on the next day. On 6 May, under the influence of the same disturbance, a low pressure system formed off the coast of Andaman and Nicobar Islands. Subsequently, the JTWC issued its TCFA, as it had rapidly consolidated its convective structure for the past few hours, along with development of a well-defined low-level center. By the morning of 7 May, the system became more well-marked over the same region. At 09:00 UTC (14:30 IST), the JTWC initiated advisories on the system and classified it as Tropical Cyclone 02B, while IMD followed the suit and upgraded it to Depression BOB 03. Three hours later, the system was further upgraded to a deep depression status by the IMD, after forming a defined central dense overcast cloud pattern. By 05:30 IST (00:00 UTC) of the next day, the system organized into Cyclonic Storm Asani, becoming the first cyclone of the season. (Note: The name Asani (Sinhala: අසනි, [asani]) was contributed by Sri Lanka and means "thunderbolt" in Sinhala.) Nine hours later, the JTWC upgraded it to a Category 1 status. At 12:00 UTC (17:30 IST), the IMD further upgraded it to a severe cyclonic storm, as microwave imagery showed a well-organized system. On 10 May, the cyclone began to encounter high wind shear due to which the JTWC downgraded it as a tropical storm while the IMD continue to maintain it as a severe cyclonic storm. it began to make a sudden westward jog and mild decrease in wind shear made the JTWC to upgrade it again into a Category 1-equivalent tropical cyclone. Nine hours later, Asani was further downgraded into a tropical storm, it began to weaken rapidly due to higher wind shear as well as dry air intrusion. On 11 May, 12:00 UTC, Asani further weakened to a Deep Depression as it made landfall in the Indian State of Andhra Pradesh. The next day, the IMD issued its last advisory as the system degenerated into a low pressure area.

=== Depression BOB 04 ===
- Depression (IMD)
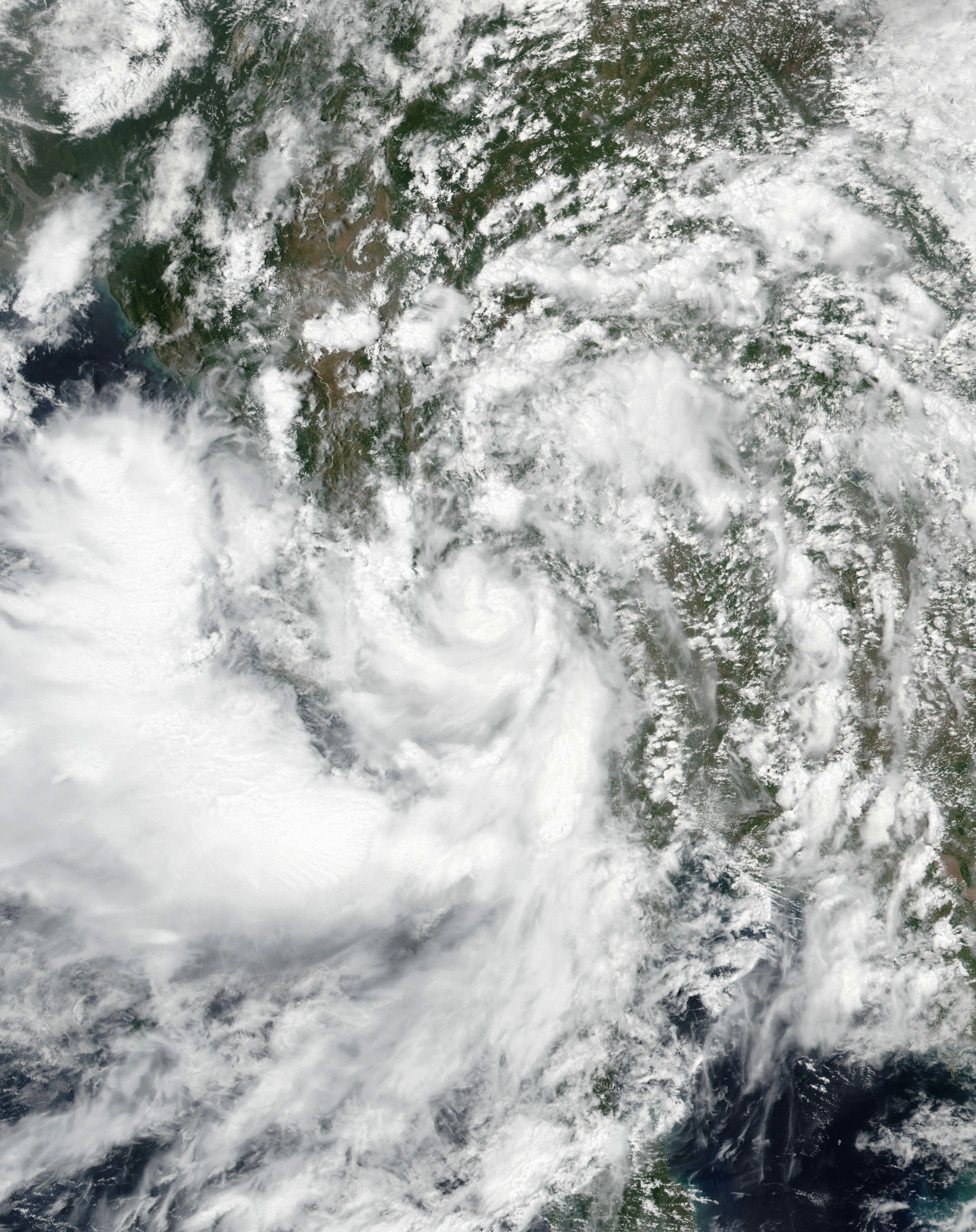
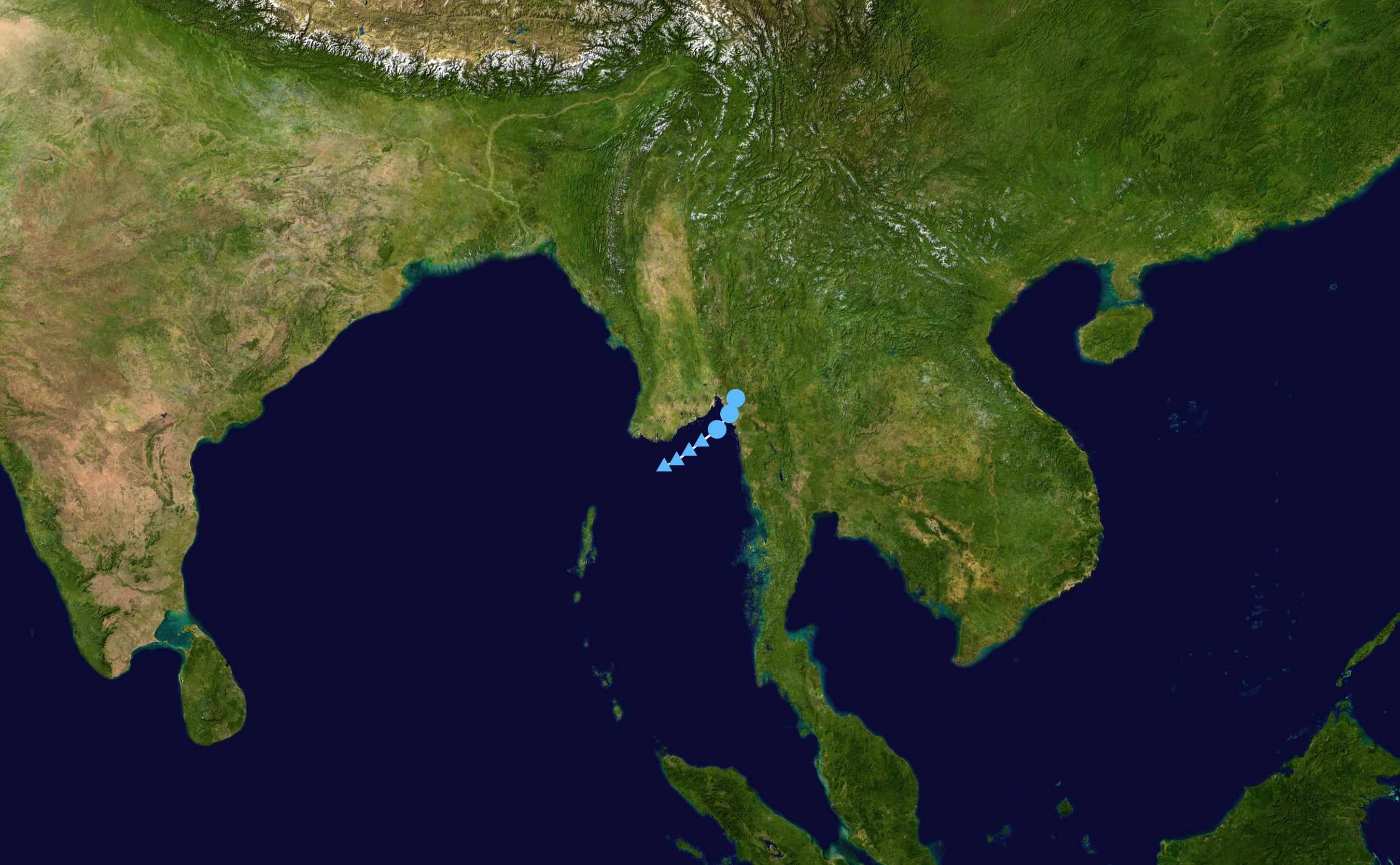
- Duration: 20 May – 21 May
- Peak intensity: 45 km/h (30 mph) (3-min); 998 hPa (mbar)

A fresh cyclonic circulation developed on early 19 May, over the Gulf of Martaban, due to the enhancement of the annual South-West monsoon over the basin. By the evening, under the influence of that circulation, a low pressure system spawned over the same region. At 18:00 UTC (23:30 IST), the JTWC also acknowledged that same circulation at the night of the same day. By 00:30 UTC (06:00 IST) the JTWC published its TCFA for the system after it had rapidly consolidated its convective structure for the past few hours, and also formed a well-defined low-level center. But eight hours later, the JTWC, cancelled it because its close proximity over land. However, according to IMD, it rapidly consolidated into a well-marked low pressure area in the morning of the same day, and further into a depression at 11:30 IST (03:00 UTC), as it moved northeastwards, towards the south Burmese coast. Between 08:00 UTC (13:30 IST) and 09:00 UTC (14:30 IST), the system made landfall over the southern Burmese coast, 30 km (20 mi) from Mawlamyine. The system maintained its depression status as it travelled inland. By 00:00 UTC (05:30 IST) the next day, the system finally weakened into a well-marked low pressure area over the Burma-Thailand.

The system helped the monsoon to further advance into parts of southern Arabian Sea, southern parts of Maldives and parts of southern and east-central Bay of Bengal.

=== Depression ARB 01 ===
- Depression (IMD)
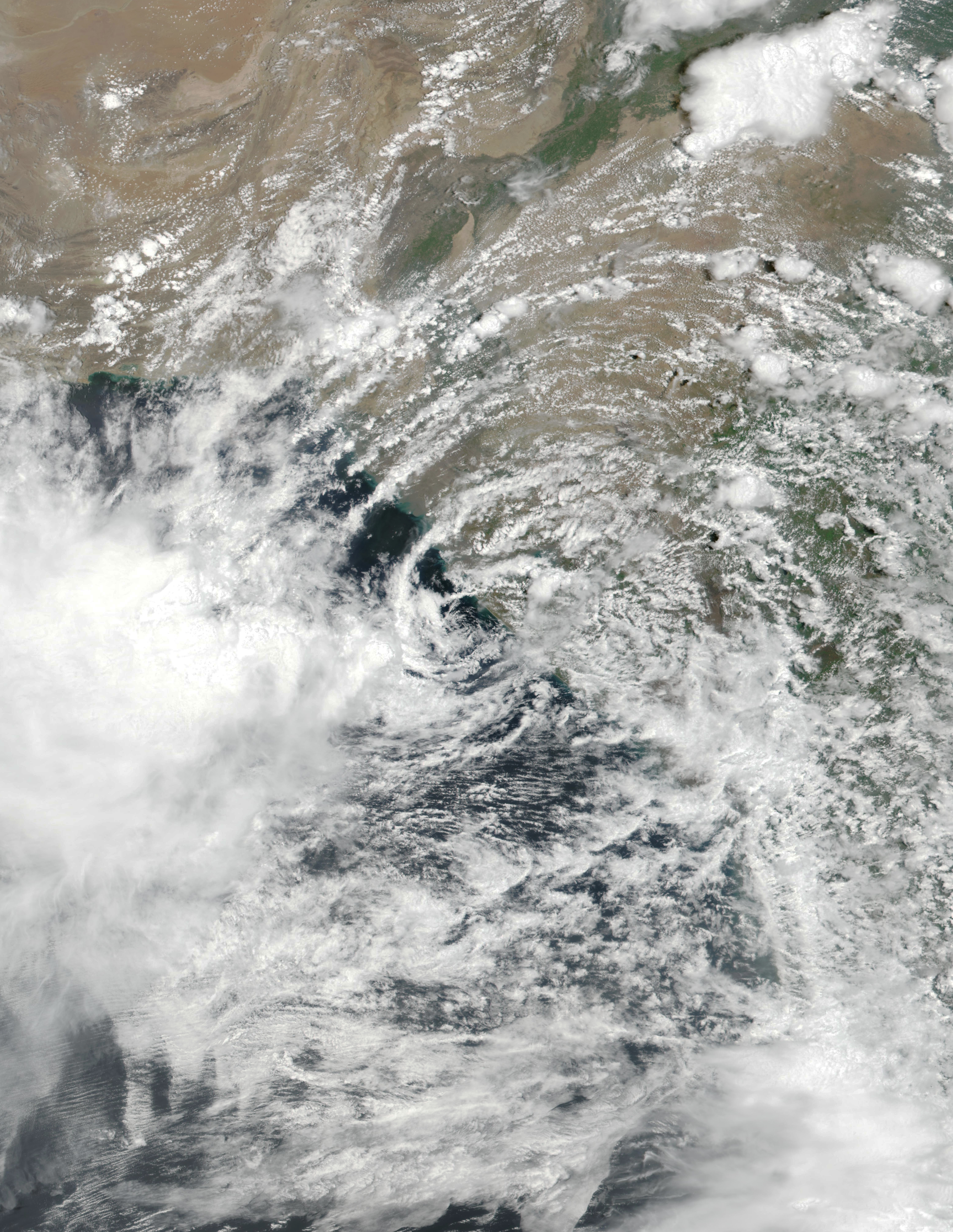
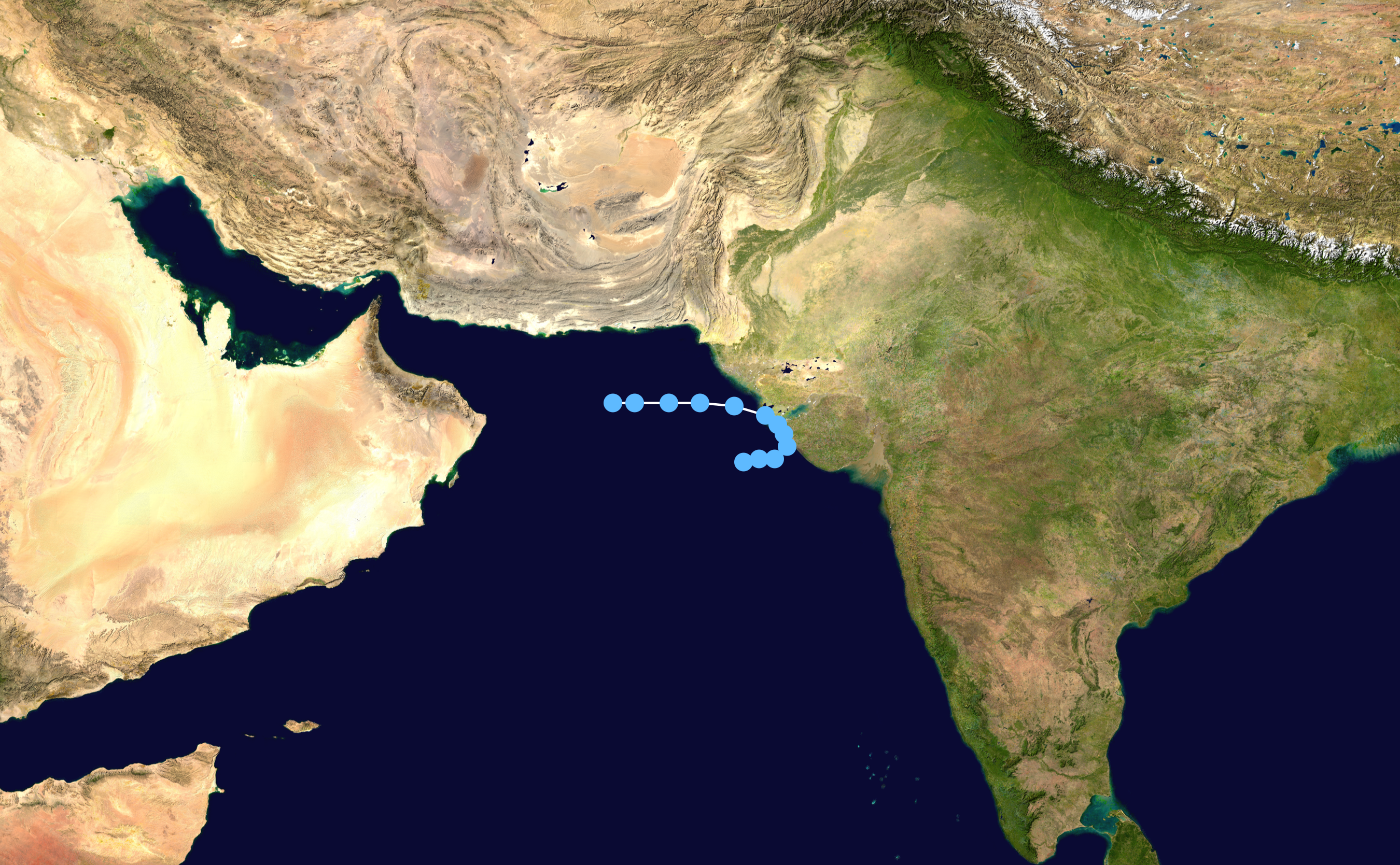
- Duration: 16 July – 18 July
- Peak intensity: 45 km/h (30 mph) (3-min); 992 hPa (mbar)

On 15 July, the JTWC started monitoring a disturbance west of Jafrabad, Gujarat, and it was unofficially designated as Invest 96A. The disturbance substantially deepened, early on the next day, which prompted JTWC to upgrade it chance of formation to medium. At 03:00 UTC of the same day, the IMD noted the disturbance and upgraded it to a tropical depression, becoming the first tropical depression of the season in the Arabian Sea. It peaked as a depression, with maximum sustained wind speed of 25 kn (45 km/h; 30 mph) and a minimum barometric pressure of 992 hPa (29.29 inHg) after its initial stage of formation. However, the system suffered from dry air intrusions as it moved away from the Indian coast. By 18:00 UTC, the JTWC ceased tracking Invest 96A, and on 18 July, the IMD issued its last warning, citing its weakening to a remnant low.

=== Depression LAND 01 ===
- Depression (IMD)
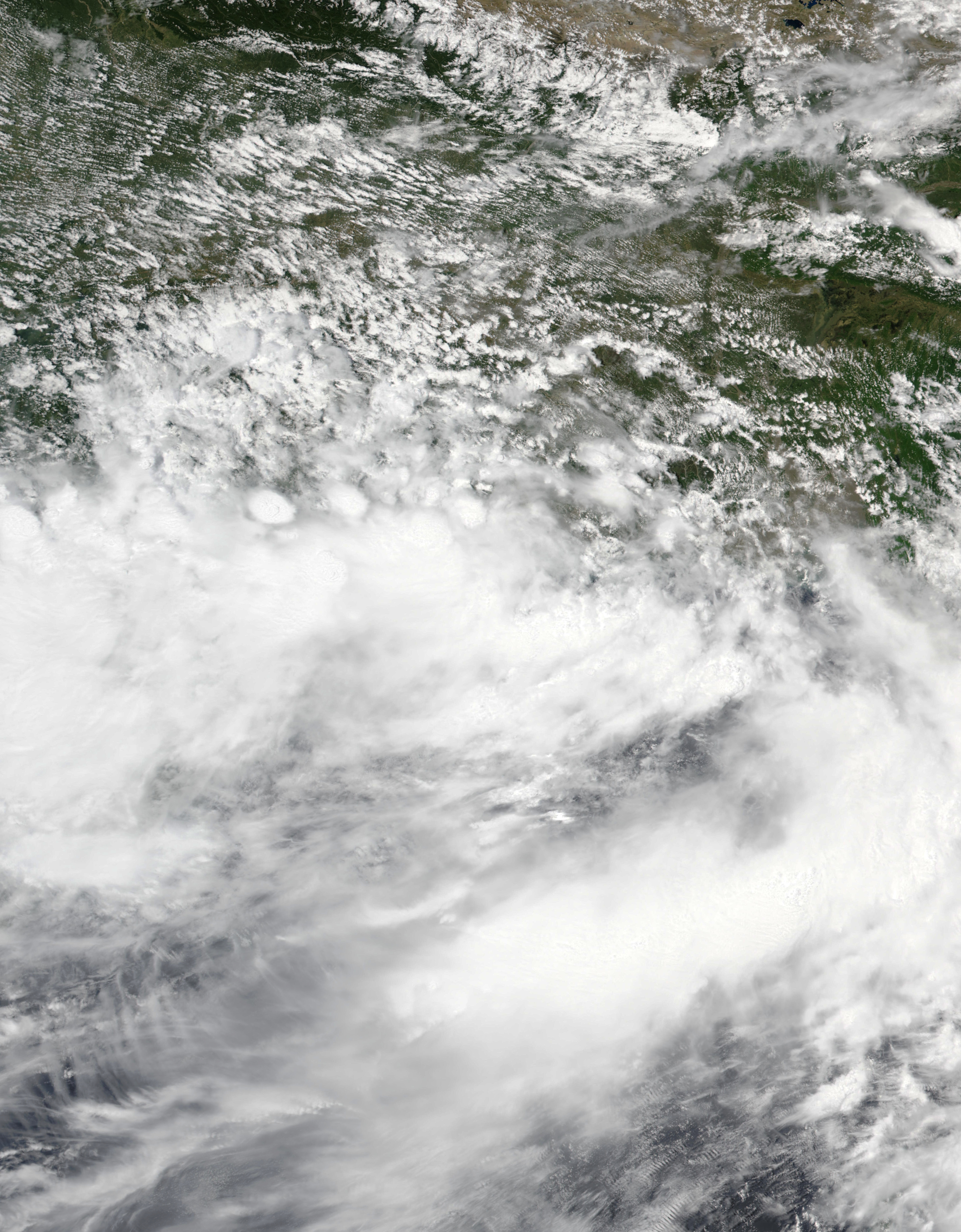
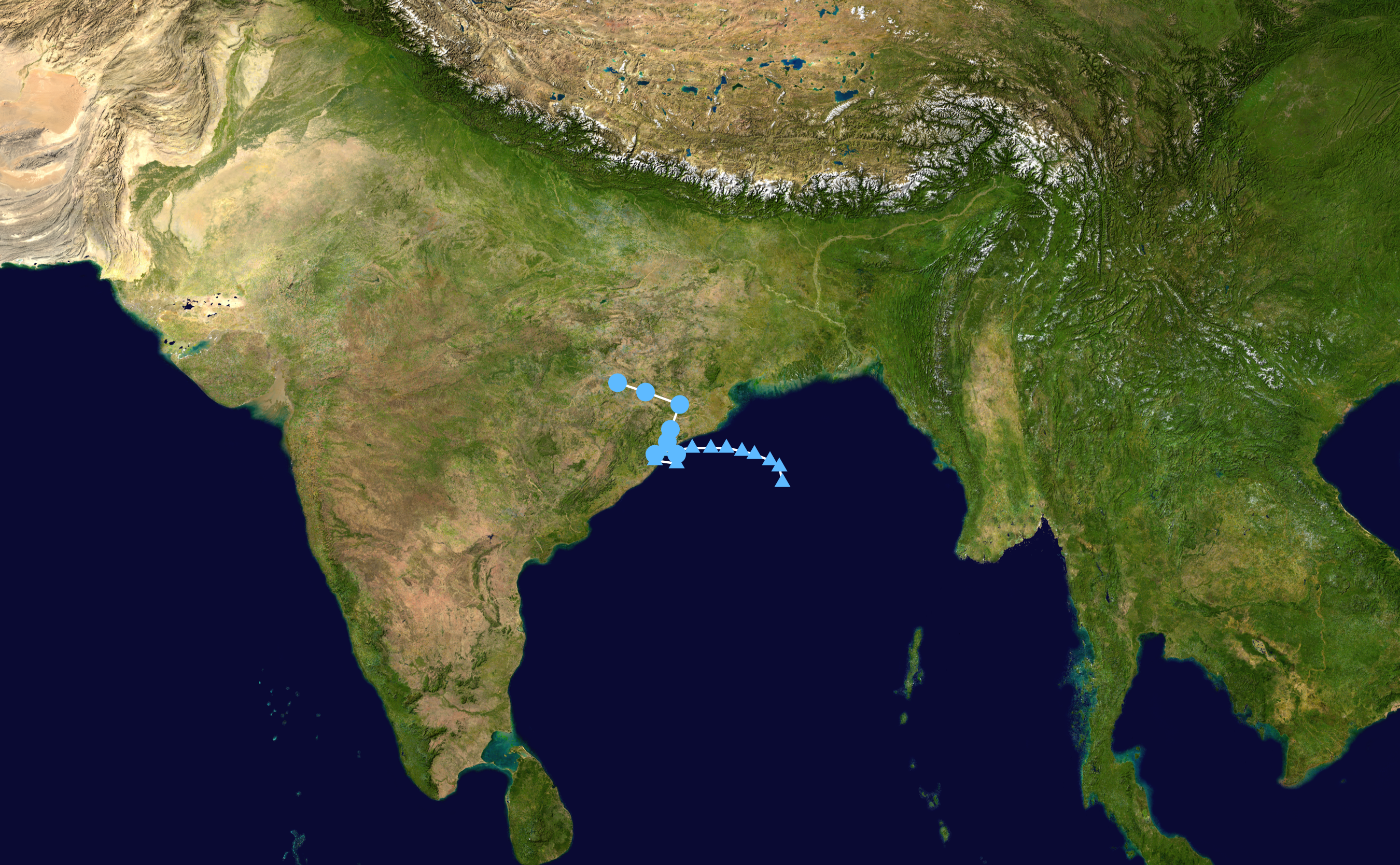
- Duration: 9 August – 10 August
- Peak intensity: 45 km/h (30 mph) (3-min); 990 hPa (mbar)

A monsoonal low spawned over the northwestern region of Bay of Bengal, off the West Bengal and Odisha coast on midday of 6 August, which later concentrated into a well-marked low pressure area on the next day. By 9 August, it concentrated into a depression, after moving over coastal Odisha due to the incoming monsoonal trade winds. It managed to maintain its intensity overland, until at 00:00 UTC (05:30 IST) of 10 August, it was downgraded to a remnant low over Chhattisgarh and adjoining east Madhya Pradesh.

=== Depression ARB 02 ===
- Depression (IMD)
- Tropical storm (SSHWS)
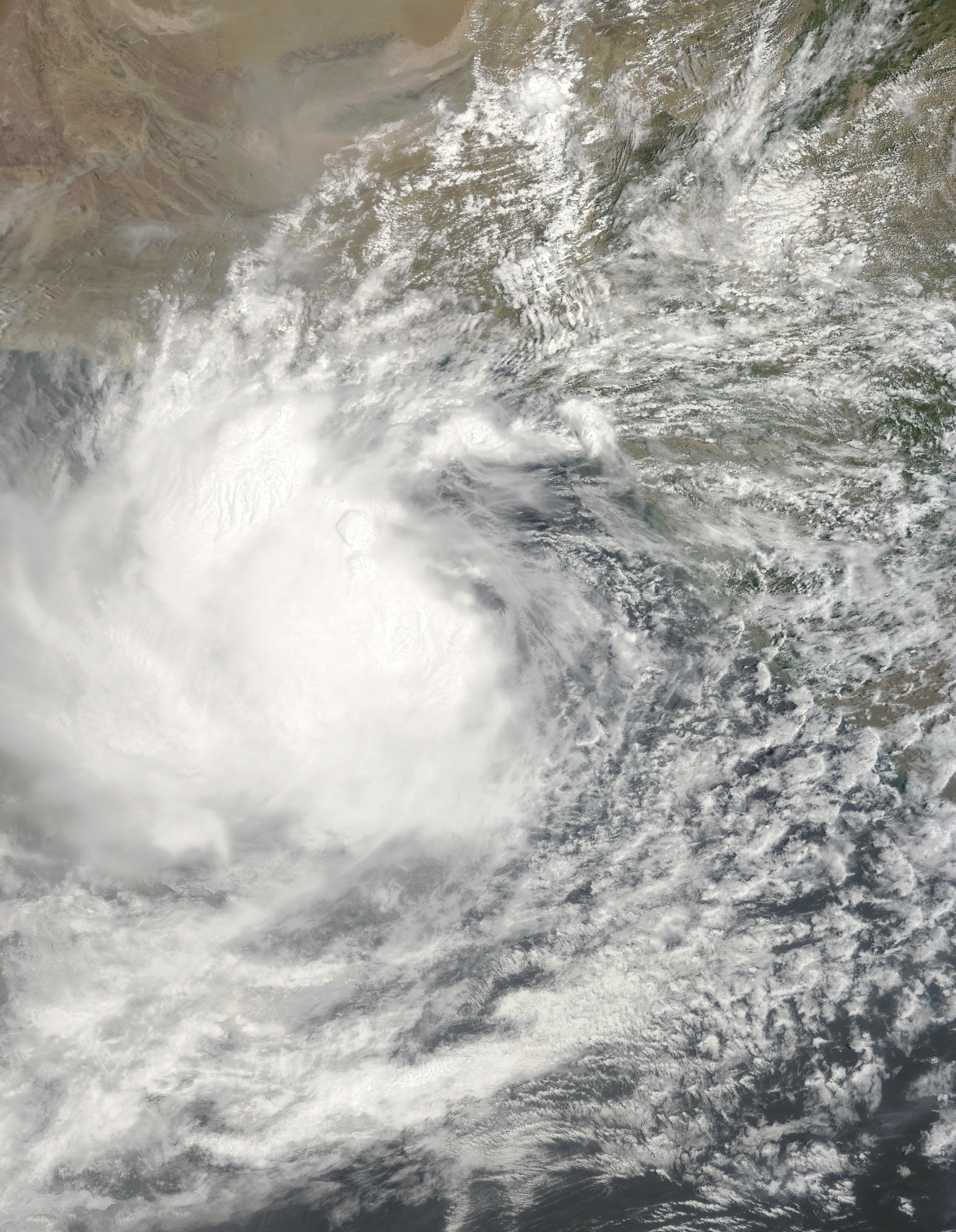
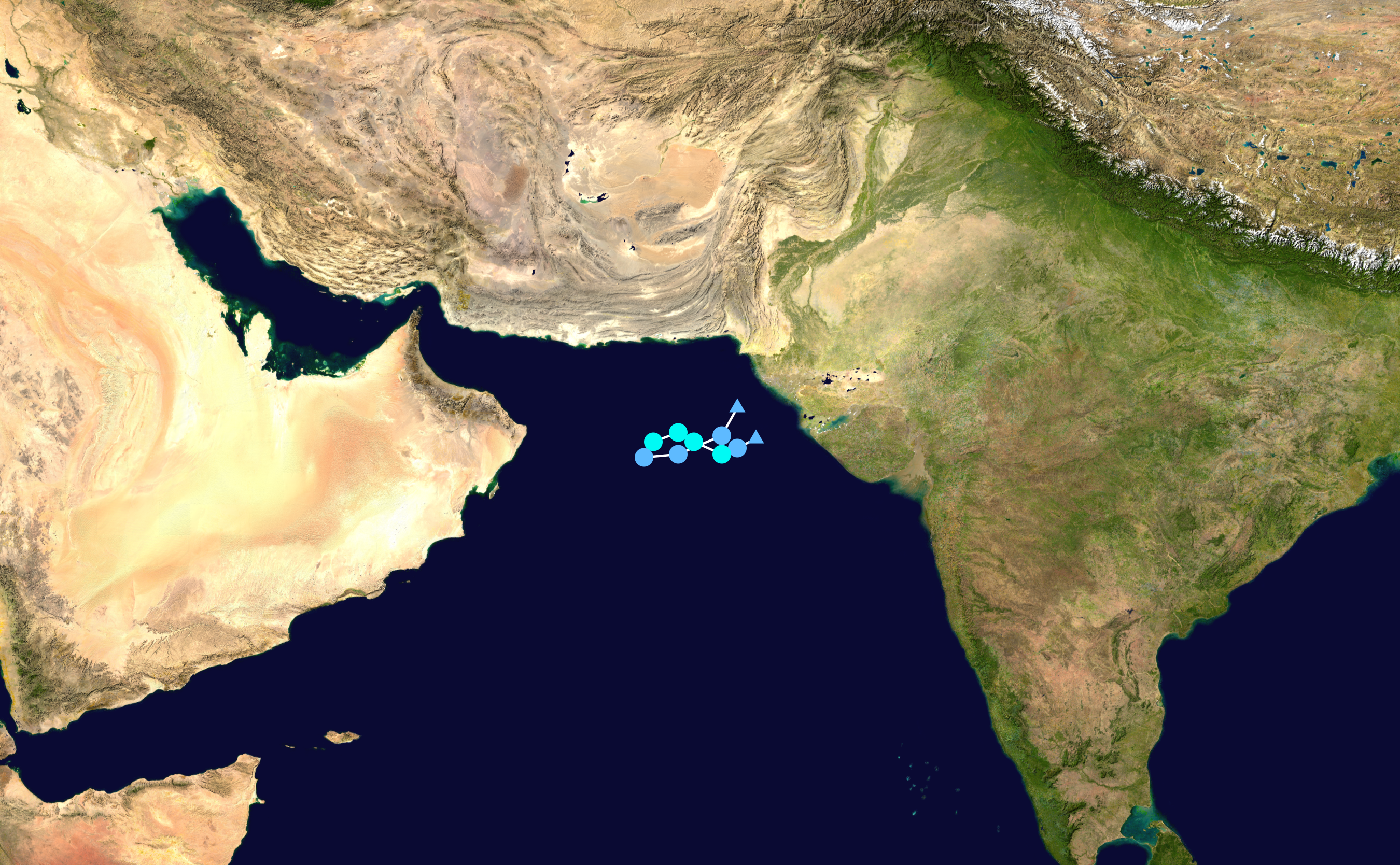
- Duration: 12 August – 13 August
- Peak intensity: 45 km/h (30 mph) (3-min); 990 hPa (mbar)

After the dissipation of Land Depression 01, a sudden surge of equatorial Rossby Waves and Kelvin Waves prevailed over the basin. These two waves helped in a formation of another monsoonal low over Saurashtra and adjoining northeastern Arabian Sea on 10 August, which later concentrated into a well-marked low pressure on 12 August. The JTWC, on the same day, designated it as Invest 98A. By 12 August, favorable conditions like high sea-surface temperature (SST), moderate wind shear and a strong pulse of MJO, helped for further concentration into a depression, but its center was sheared due to wind shear. The JTWC soon followed the suit and upgraded it to Tropical Cyclone 03A. However, as it moved westwards away from the Indian coastline, the wind shear increased significantly, which decayed its convective structure. At 03:00 UTC (08:30 IST), the JTWC ceased issuing advisories to the system. Nine hours later, the IMD followed the same, and downgraded the system to a remnant low.

=== Depression BOB 05 ===
- Depression (IMD)
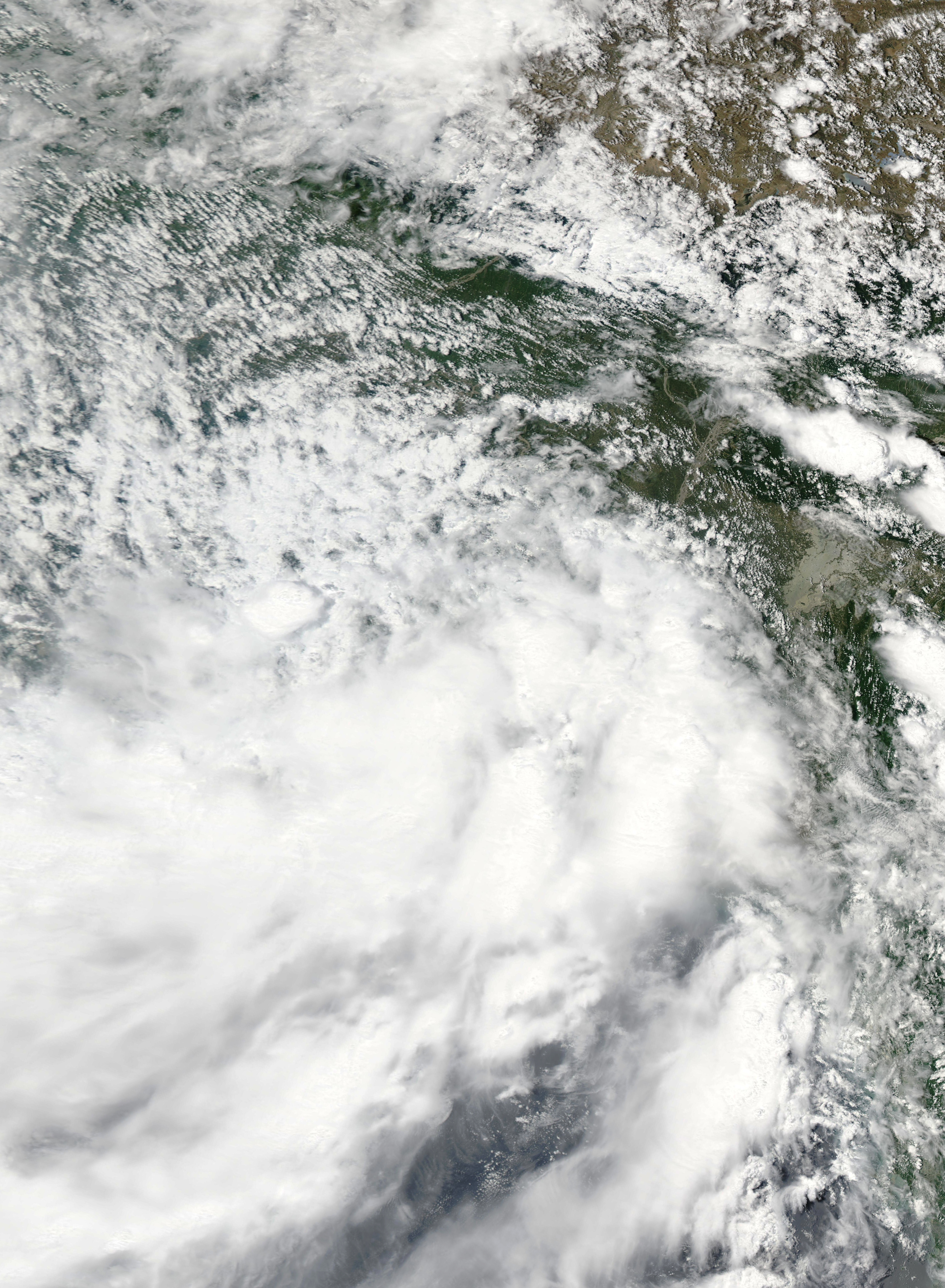
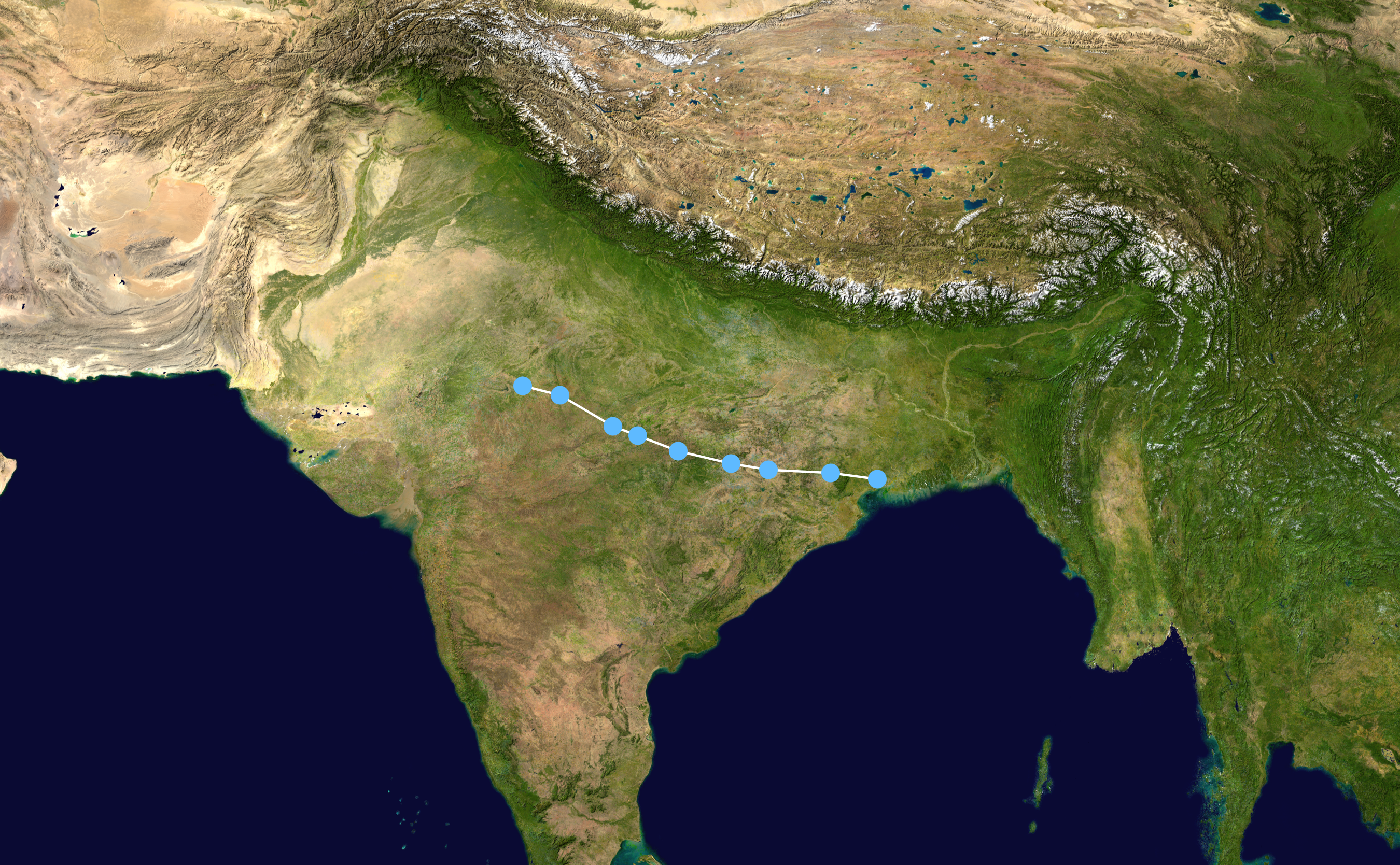
- Duration: 14 August – 17 August
- Peak intensity: 45 km/h (30 mph) (3-min); 994 hPa (mbar)

Under an influence of another cyclonic circulation, a low pressure area formed over north Bay of Bengal on 13 August. Substantially, it concentrated into a well-marked low pressure area on the same day. After reaching near the coast of northern Odisha and West Bengal, it further concentrated into a depression at 03:00 UTC (08:30 IST) of 14 August. The depression made landfall near Digha, West Bengal, two hours after its designation. Brown ocean effect played a major role in the system's lifetime, as it managed to maintain its depression status over land for three days. Along with brown ocean effect, low vertical wind shear and moisture feeding monsoonal trade winds also helped to retain its intensity. At 12:00 UTC (17:30 IST) of 17 August, the depression finally weakened into a well-marked low pressure over southwestern Rajasthan. The system caused widespread heavy rainfall across Odisha, West Bengal, Jharkhand, Central India and Rajasthan.

=== Deep Depression BOB 06 ===
- Deep depression (IMD)
- Tropical storm (SSHWS)
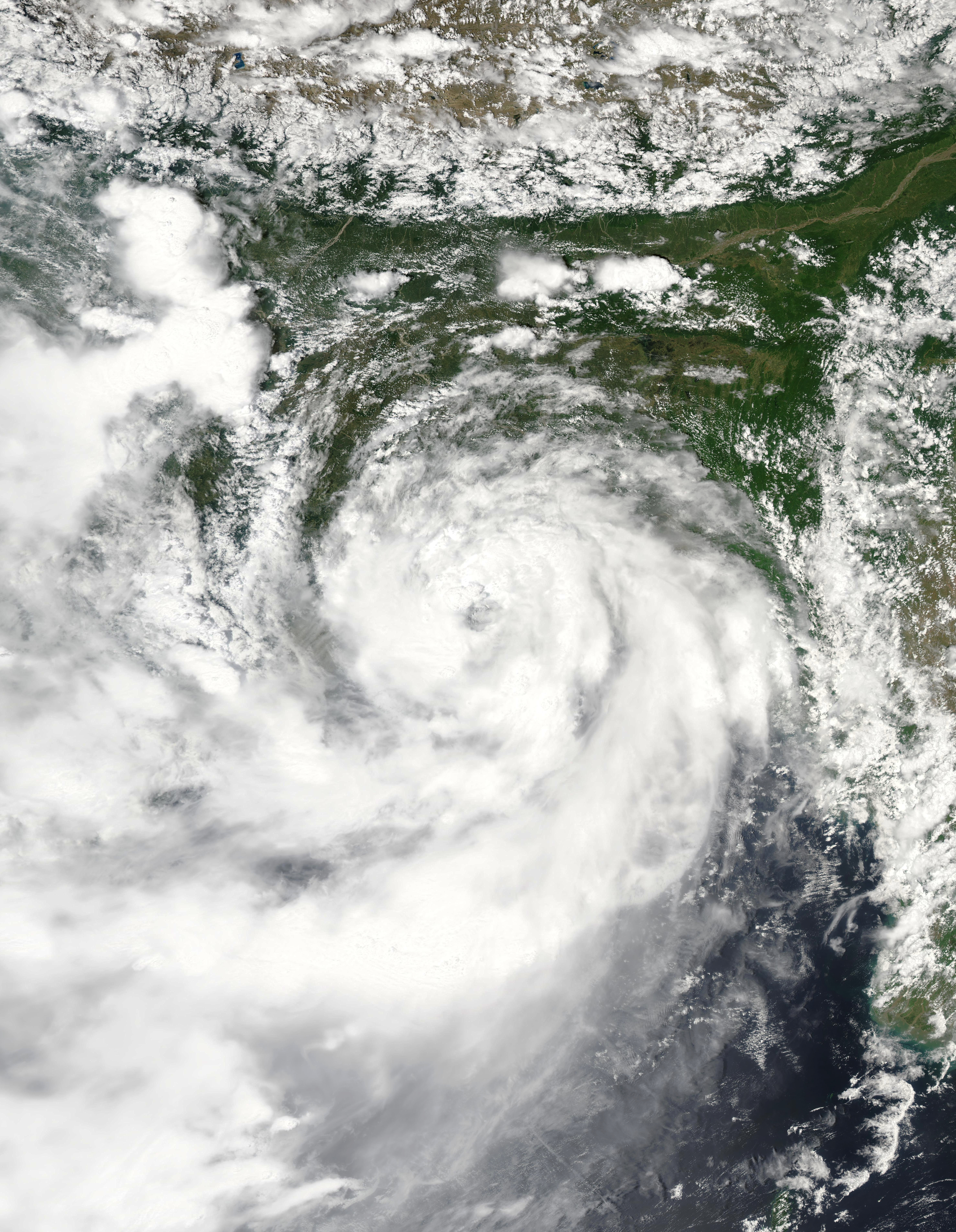
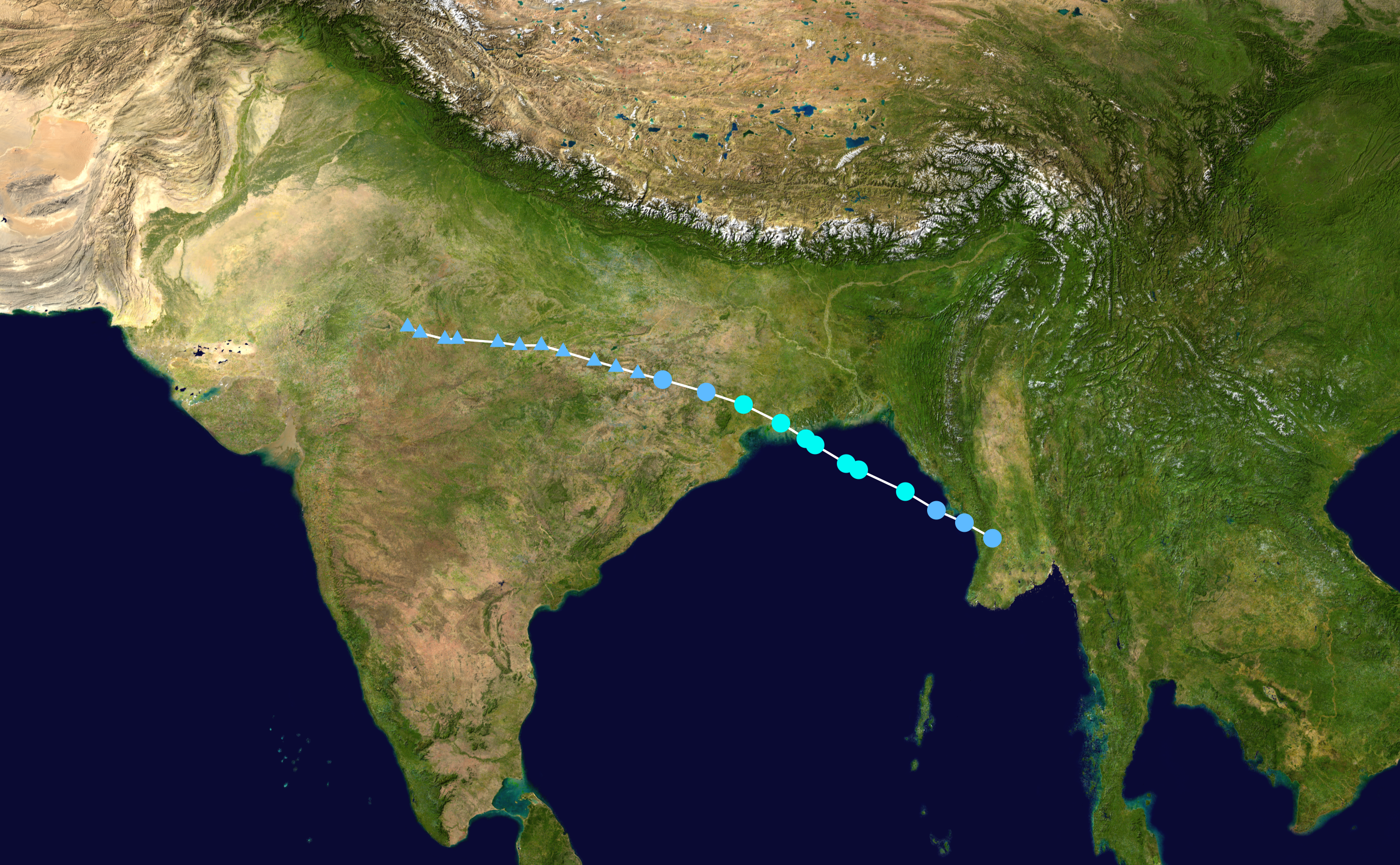
- Duration: 18 August – 23 August
- Peak intensity: 55 km/h (35 mph) (3-min); 992 hPa (mbar)

On 17 August, the JTWC recognized a newly formed low level circulation near Myanmar and designated it Invest 99B, which showed disorganized convective structure and an obscure low-level center. By the next day, it developed into a low pressure area over northeastern Bay of Bengal and adjoining Bangladesh coast. The JTWC unofficially released a TCFA for the system after its rapid development of its convective structure. By the same day, at 21:00 UTC (02:30 IST), the JTWC unofficially declared it Tropical Cyclone 04B. The IMD followed the same, and upgraded it to Depression BOB 06. At 06:00 UTC (11:30 IST) on 19 August, BOB 06 further organized into a deep depression just off the coast of West Bengal and Bangladesh. Shortly after intensifying, it made landfall close to Digha, West Bengal between 13:30 UTC and 14:30 UTC (19:00 IST and 20:00 IST) that same day. At 21:00 UTC (02:30 IST), the JTWC issued its last advisory. After landfall, the system continued to track west-northwestwards, eventually weakening into a depression on 21 August over northeastern Madhya Pradesh and southeastern Uttar Pradesh. The system persisted for another two days until 23 August, when it weakened into a well-marked low pressure area over eastern Rajasthan and adjoining northwestern Madhya Pradesh.

A total of 32 cyclone-related deaths occurred due to the effects of BOB 06, primarily from flooding. The depression's influence brought extremely heavy rainfall across east and central India over a period of several days, dropping up to 23 cm (9.1 in) of precipitation over Bhograi on 20 August. Impacts were primarily felt in Odisha; rainfall led to landslides and flooding affecting at least 13 districts in Odisha, with 900 villages inundated and 170,000 people displaced by 22 August. Losses from the 2022 Odisha Floods, which BOB 06 contributed to, totalled Rs126.62 crore (US$15.8 million).

=== Depression LAND 02 ===
- Depression (IMD)
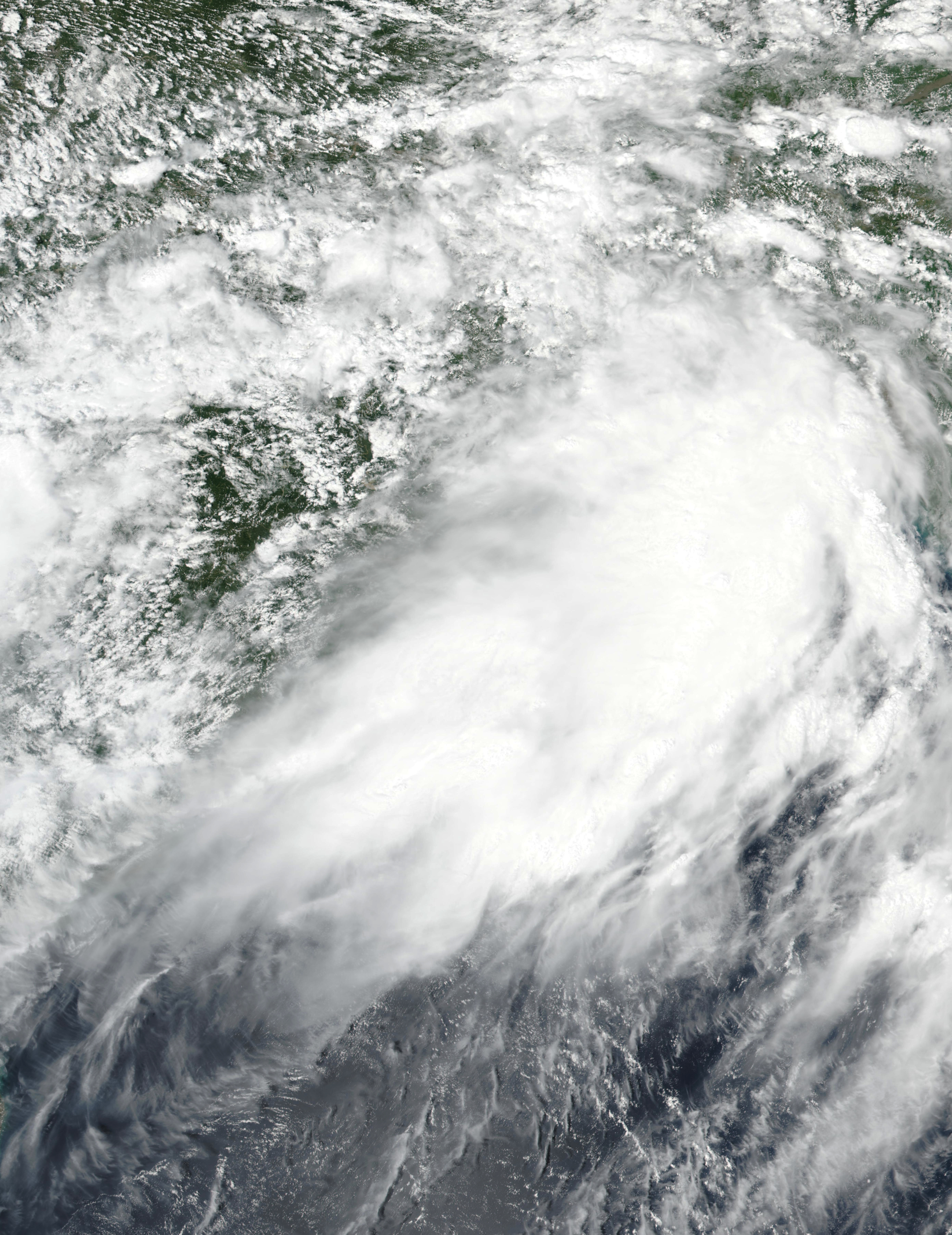
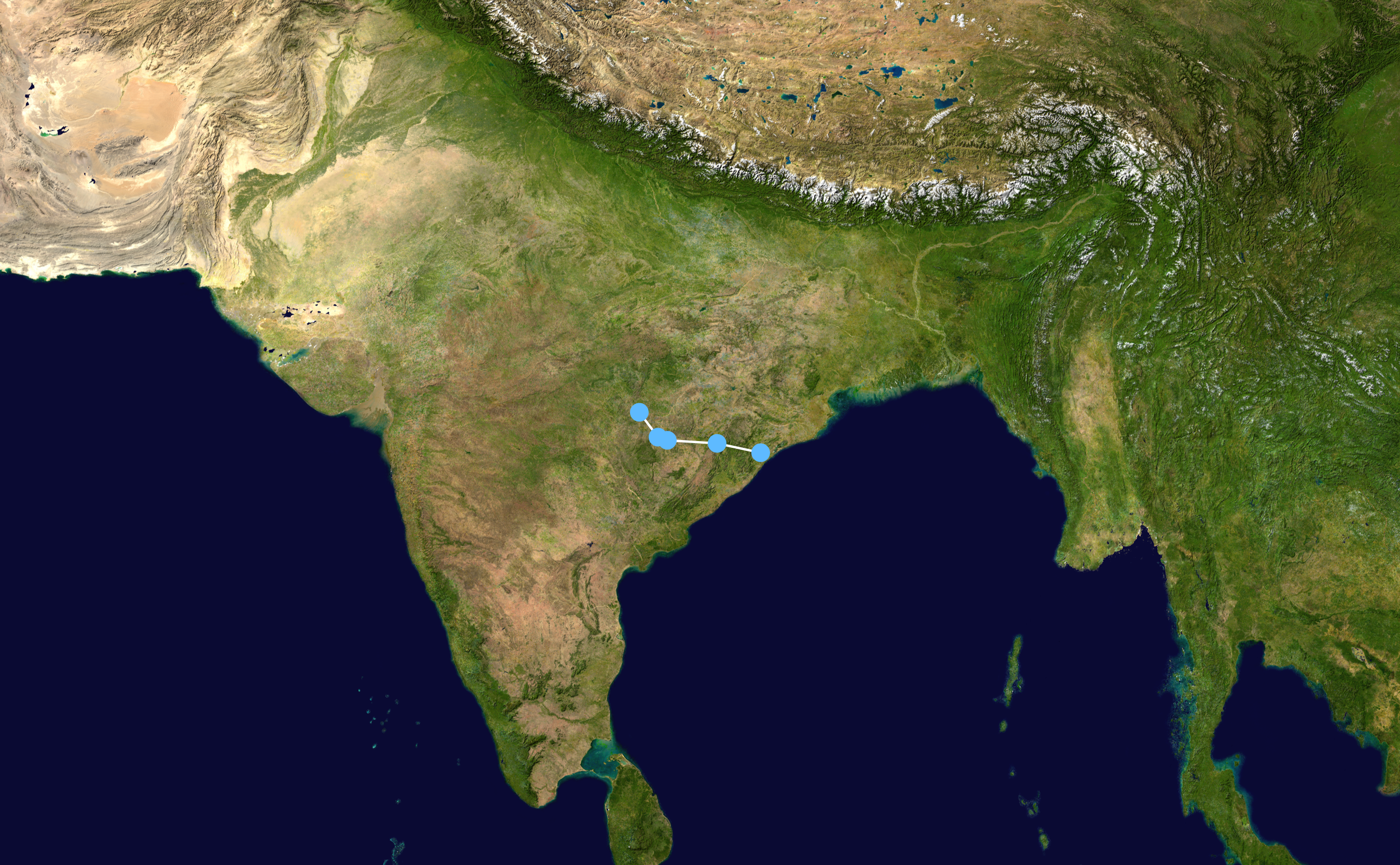
- Duration: 11 September – 12 September
- Peak intensity: 45 km/h (30 mph) (3-min); 998 hPa (mbar)

Early on 7 September, a low-pressure area formed over near the center of the Bay of Bengal under the influence of a cyclonic circulation. The low developed over the next several days under favourable conditions, eventually organizing into a depression over southern Odisha by 00:00 UTC on 11 September. The depression moved inland in a west-northwest direction, turning northwest early the next day. The depression subsequently lost organization, degenerating into a well-marked low pressure area over southern Chhattsigarh by 03:00 UTC on 12 September.

The depression brought moderate to heavy rainfall to the states of Odisha, Chhattsigarh, and Telangana. No damages were reported from the effects of Land Depression 02.

=== Cyclonic Storm Sitrang ===
- Cyclonic storm (IMD)
- Tropical storm (SSHWS)
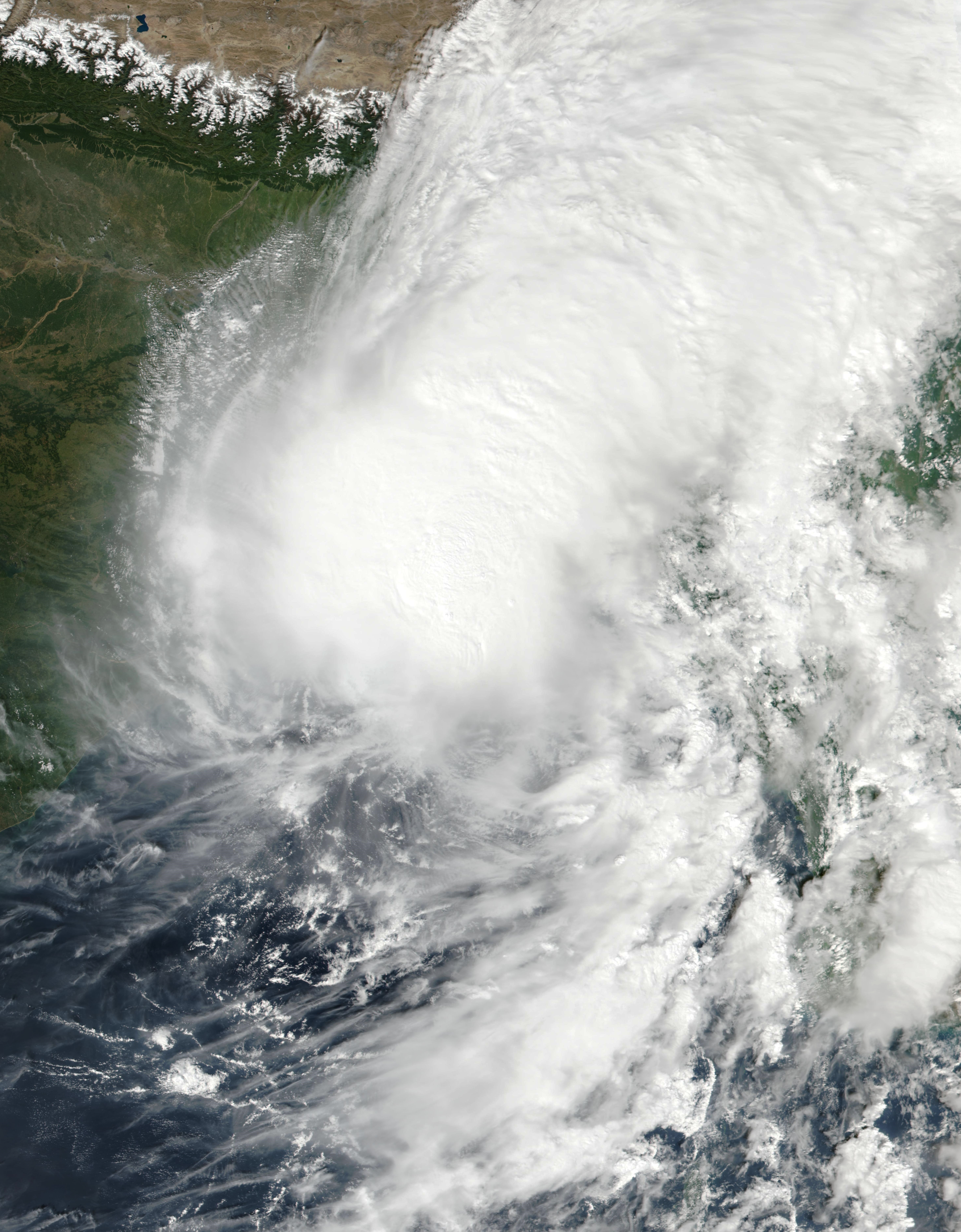
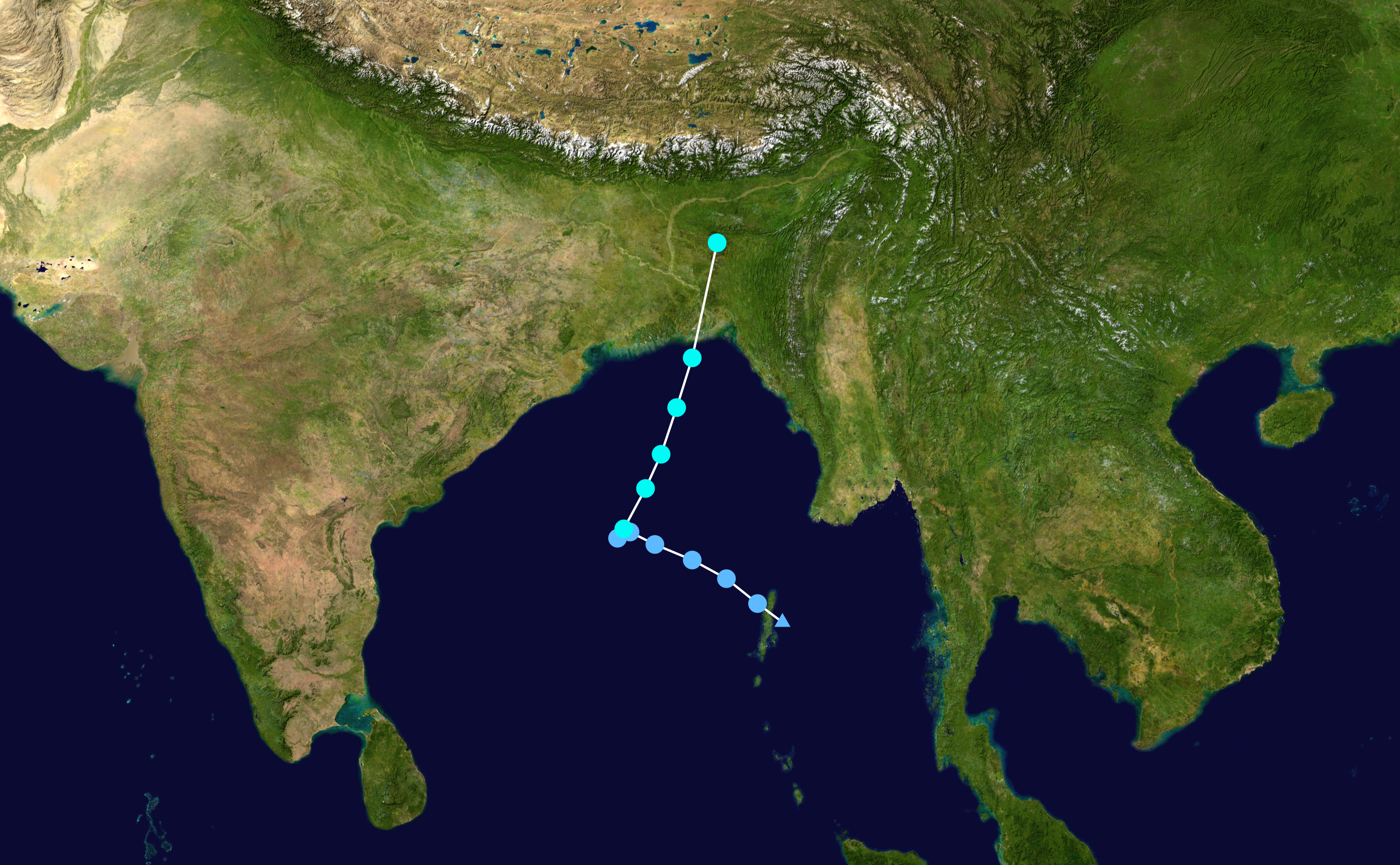
- Duration: 22 October – 25 October
- Peak intensity: 85 km/h (50 mph) (3-min); 994 hPa (mbar)

Sitrang originated from an area of low pressure near the Bay of Bengal offshore the Andaman and Nicobar Islands on 17 October, although it was designated as having a "low" chance for development at first. Later, during its existence, the Indian Meteorological Department designated a "high" possibility of the system becoming a depression. Days later, warm waters and less wind shear contributed to favorable conditions for development, and the IMD classified the low pressure area as a depression, being called BOB 07, according to the third bulletin. The Joint Typhoon Warning Center issued a Tropical Cyclone Formation Alert (TCFA) on the system by 15:00 UTC of 22 October. Hours later, BOB 07 gained momentum and in the agency's fifth bulletin, it was reported that it had intensified into a deep depression. On 23 October, the cyclone gained more strength and reached the status of a cyclonic storm, being called Sitrang by the India Meteorological Department. (Note: The name Sitrang (Thai: ศรีตรัง, [siː˩˩˦ traŋ˧]) was contributed by Thailand and refers to the blue jacaranda (Jacaranda mimosifolia) in Thai.) By 09:00 UTC of 23 October, the JTWC designated the storm as Tropical Storm 05B. As it was predicted to make landfall over Bangladesh, there was a prediction that Sitrang would turn into a severe cyclonic storm, but dry air hindered its intensification. Upon making landfall near Patuakhali, Bangladesh, in the early hours of 24 October, the cyclone began to lose strength and was downgraded to a deep depression. The JTWC issued final warning on the system by 21:00 UTC of 24 October. Afterwards, Sitrang continued to weaken, and in its thirteenth and final bulletin, the IMD declared that the cyclone was downgraded to a low pressure area by 06:00 UTC of 25 October. It dissipated over Northeast India that evening.

Sitrang was the first cyclone to hit Bangladesh since Cyclone Mora in 2017. During its passage, at least 24 people died and another 8 are missing. In Bangladesh, 700,000 people were evacuated from their homes because of heavy rains. Damage was also recorded in eastern India. At least 8 million customers lost power. About 20 fishermen were rescued in the Bay of Bengal by the Indian Coast Guard.

=== Depression BOB 08 ===
- Depression (IMD)
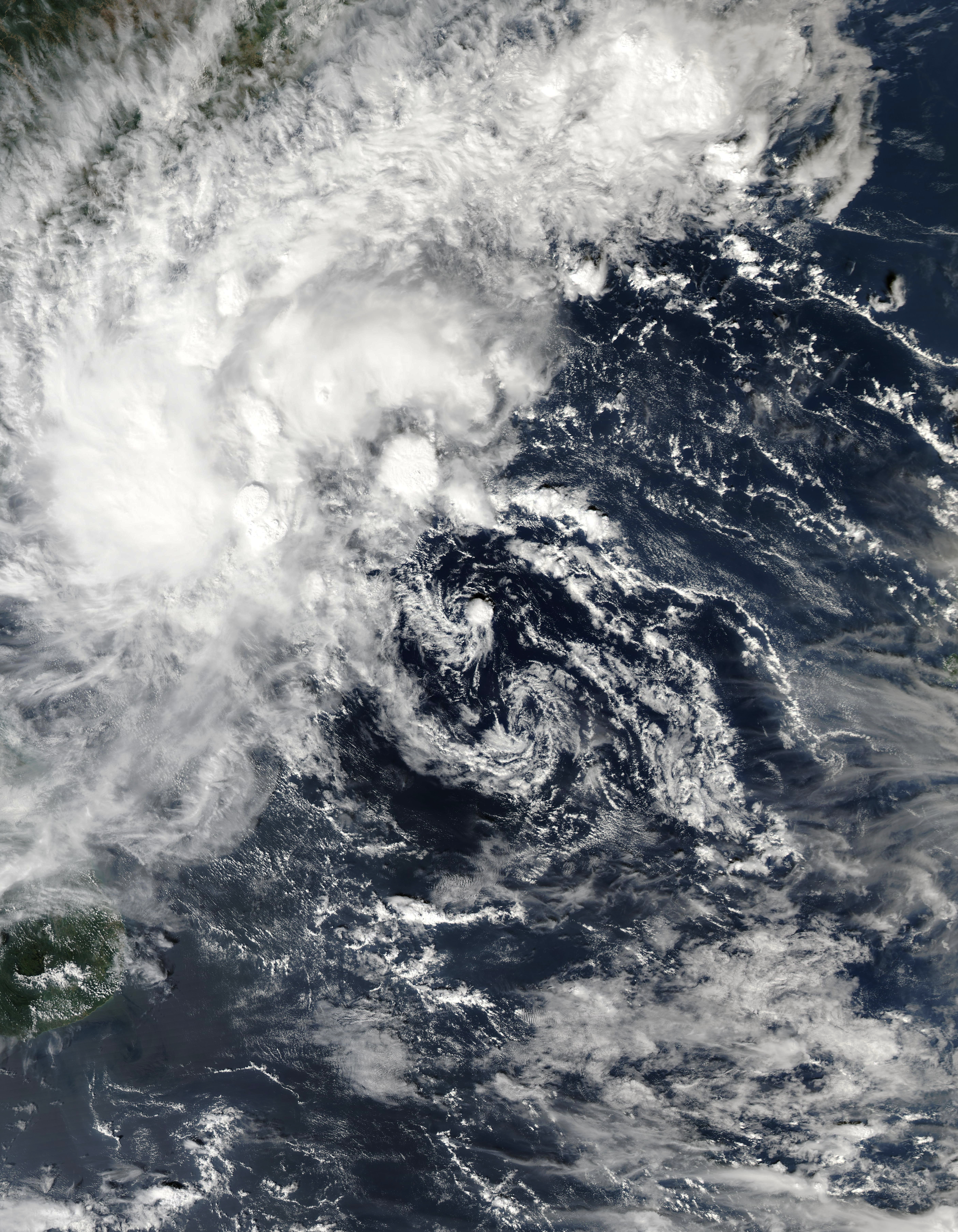
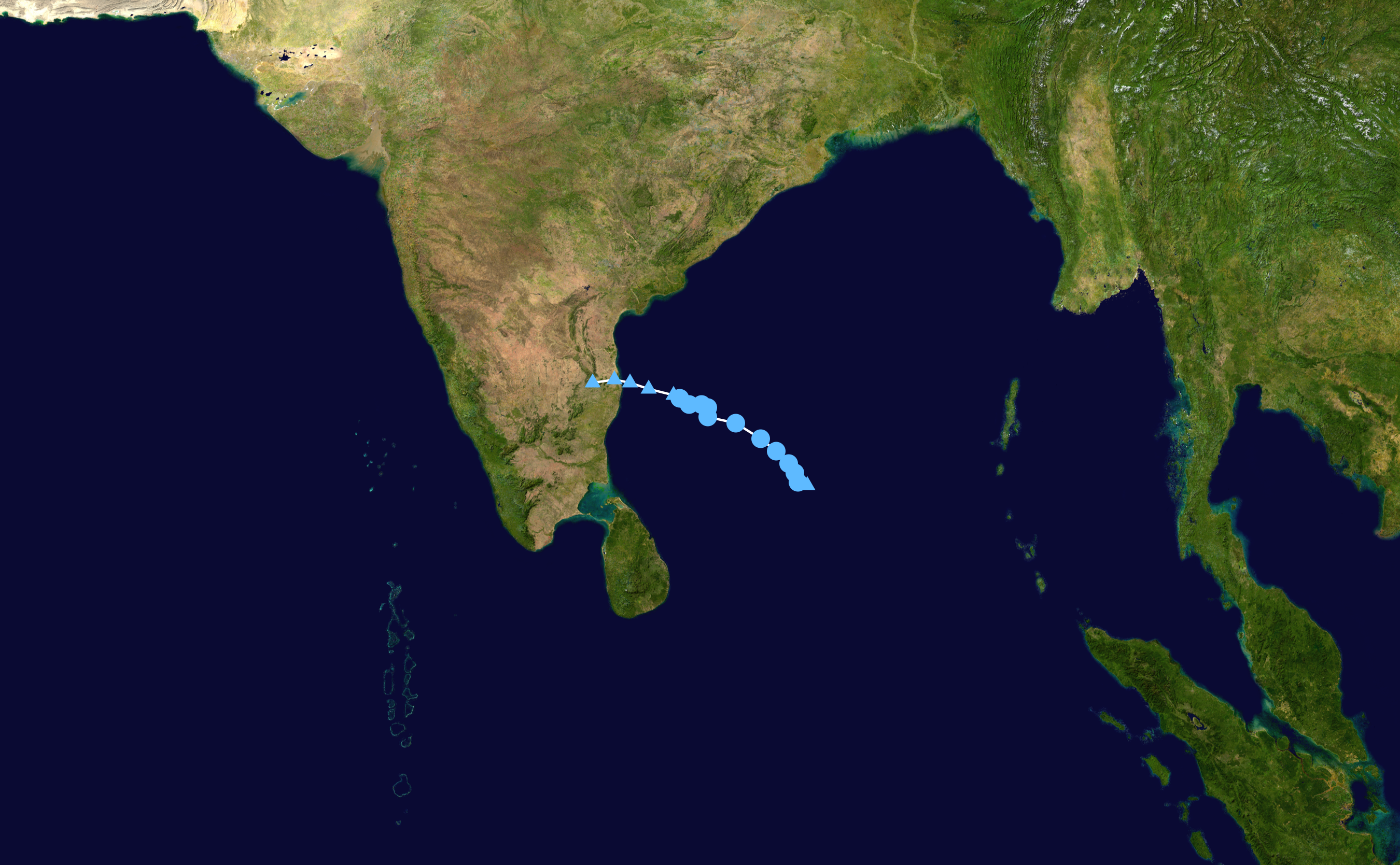
- Duration: 19 November – 22 November
- Peak intensity: 45 km/h (30 mph) (3-min); 1003 hPa (mbar)

On 15 November, the IMD noted that a low-pressure area could form over the Bay of Bengal and develop into a depression over the next several days as it moved west-northwestwards. By 17 November, a low-pressure area developed over the southeastern Bay of Bengal under the influence of a mid-level cyclonic circulation situated over the southern Andaman Sea. Several days later, at 20:30 UTC (00:00 IST) on 19 November, the low organized into a depression about 600 km (370 mi) east of Jaffna, thus becoming BOB 08. Soon after, the depression began tracking northwestward as it was subjected to moderate wind shear, before turning into a west-northwestward direction again the next day. At 03:00 UTC (06:30 IST) on 22 November, BOB 08 degenerated into a well-marked low pressure area as it succumbed to the influence of wind shear and dry air; it then dissipated over northern Tamil Nadu on 24 November.

=== Severe Cyclonic Storm Mandous ===
- Severe cyclonic storm (IMD)
- Tropical storm (SSHWS)
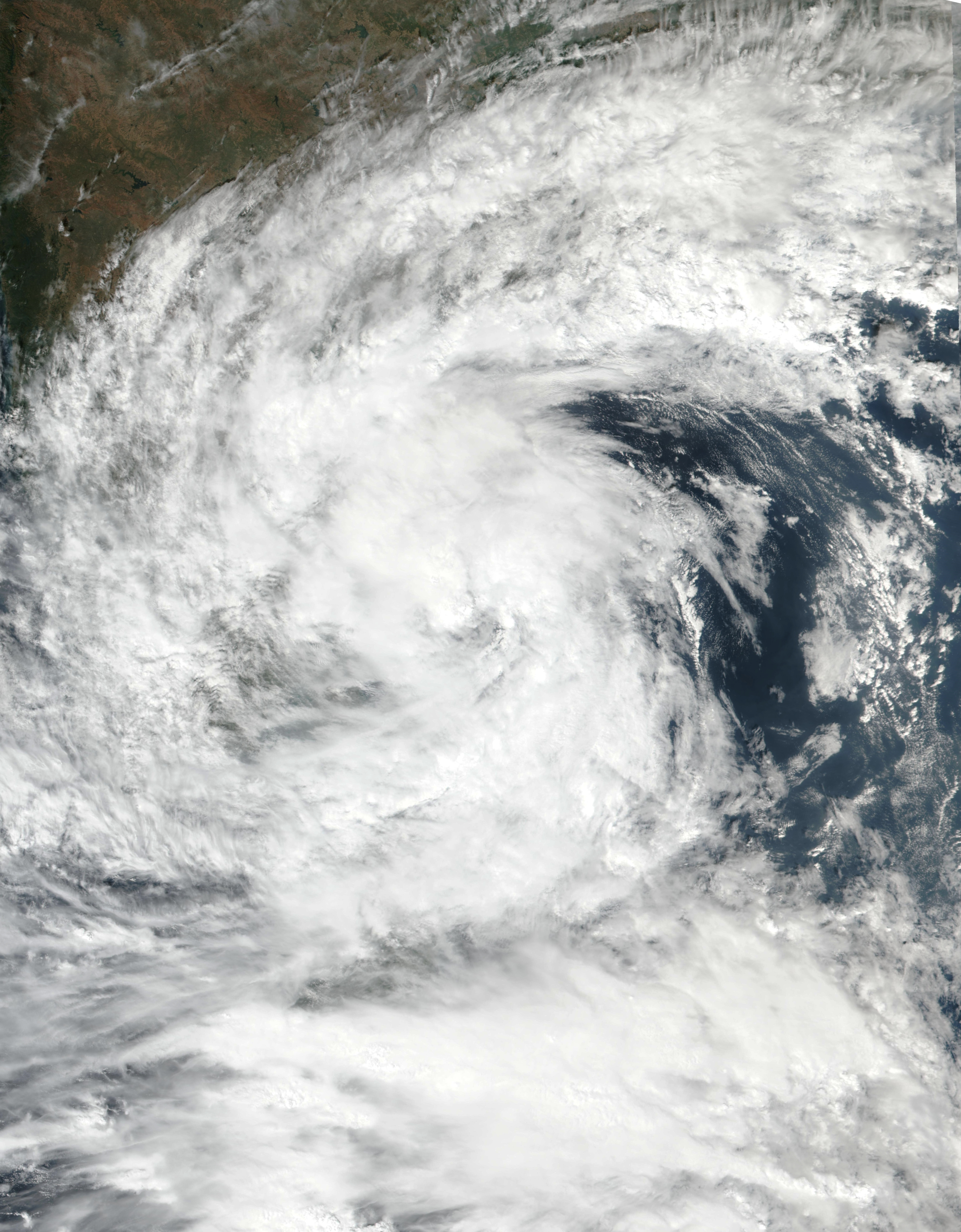
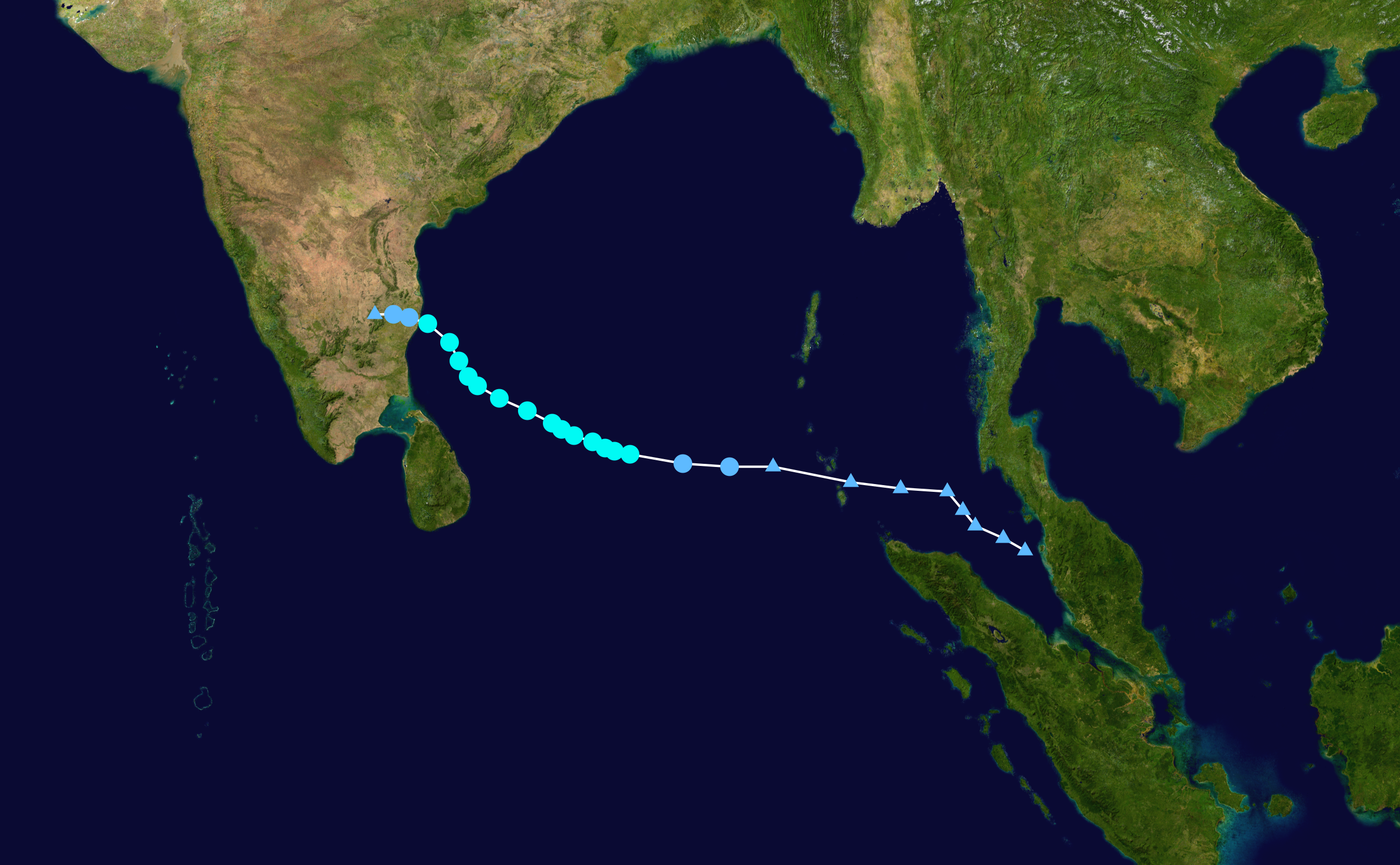
- Duration: 6 December – 10 December
- Peak intensity: 95 km/h (60 mph) (3-min); 990 hPa (mbar)

The Indian Meteorological Department issued a bulletin stating that a tropical depression had formed in the Bay of Bengal and was designated BOB 09. The JTWC, released a TCFA on the system, stating that it could intensify further, because of very warm waters and low to moderate wind shear, designating it Invest 96B. A day later, both the JTWC and IMD classified this low pressure as a "cyclonic storm" and it was named Mandous. (Note: The name Mandous (Arabic: مندوس, [manduːs]) was contributed by the United Arab Emirates and refers to wooden chests used to hold valuables in Arabic.) Mandous continued tracking westward, attaining wind speeds of 95 km/h (59 mph), thus strengthening into a Severe Cyclonic Storm. As it continued tracking westward, land interaction caused in to fall to Cyclonic Storm intensity. It later made landfall around Chennai, India as a Deep Depression. It fell to Depression intensity and later degenerated into a remnant low.

In Chennai, about 200 trees were uprooted due to Cyclone Mandous. Damage in Anantapur was Rs45 million (US$550 thousand). Four people died Tamil Nadu from heavy rains. Five fishermen went missing off the coast of Sri Lanka due to the storm. Mandous caused nine deaths in total; four in Tamil Nadu and five in Sri Lanka.

=== Deep Depression ARB 03 ===
- Deep depression (IMD)
- Tropical storm (SSHWS)
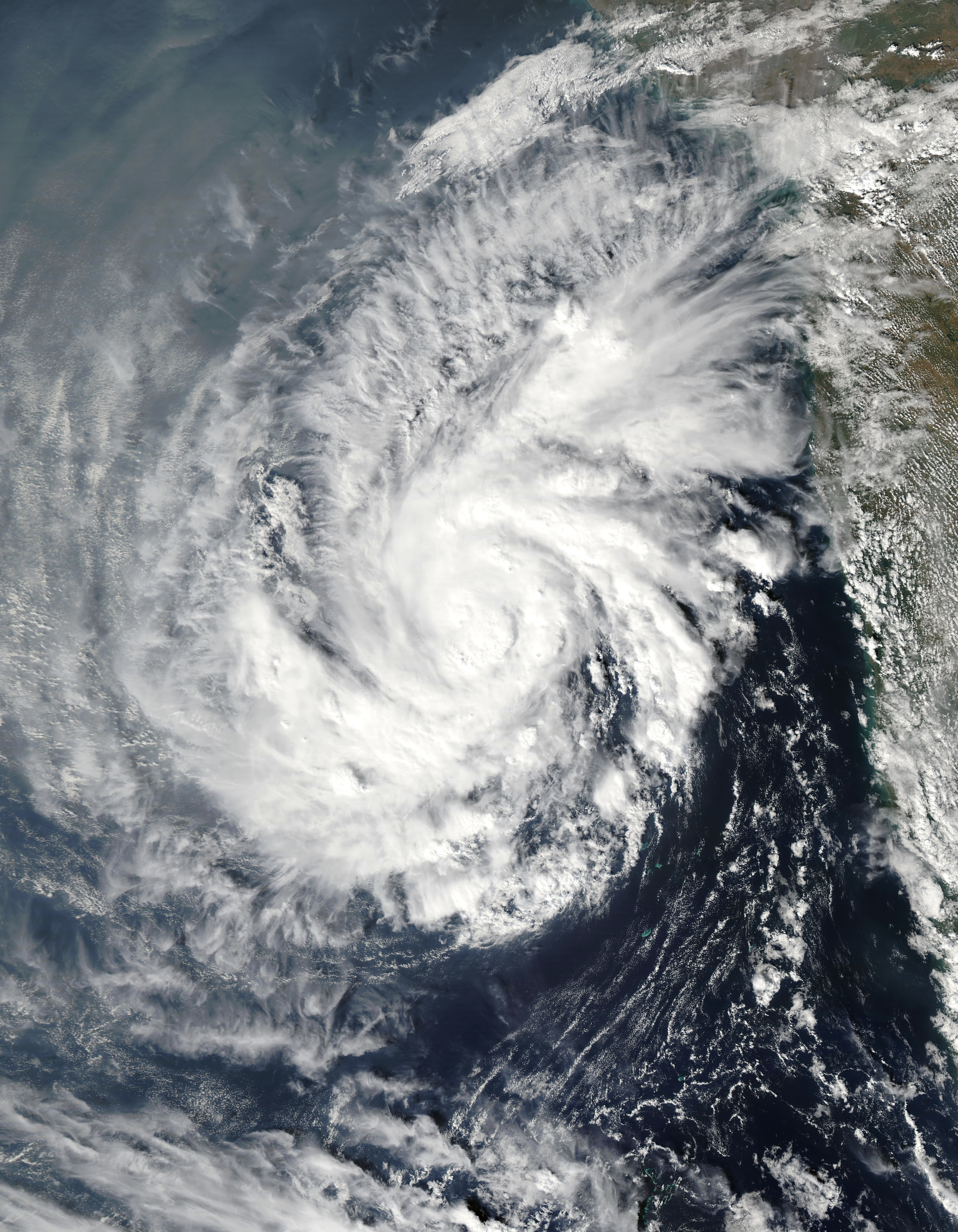
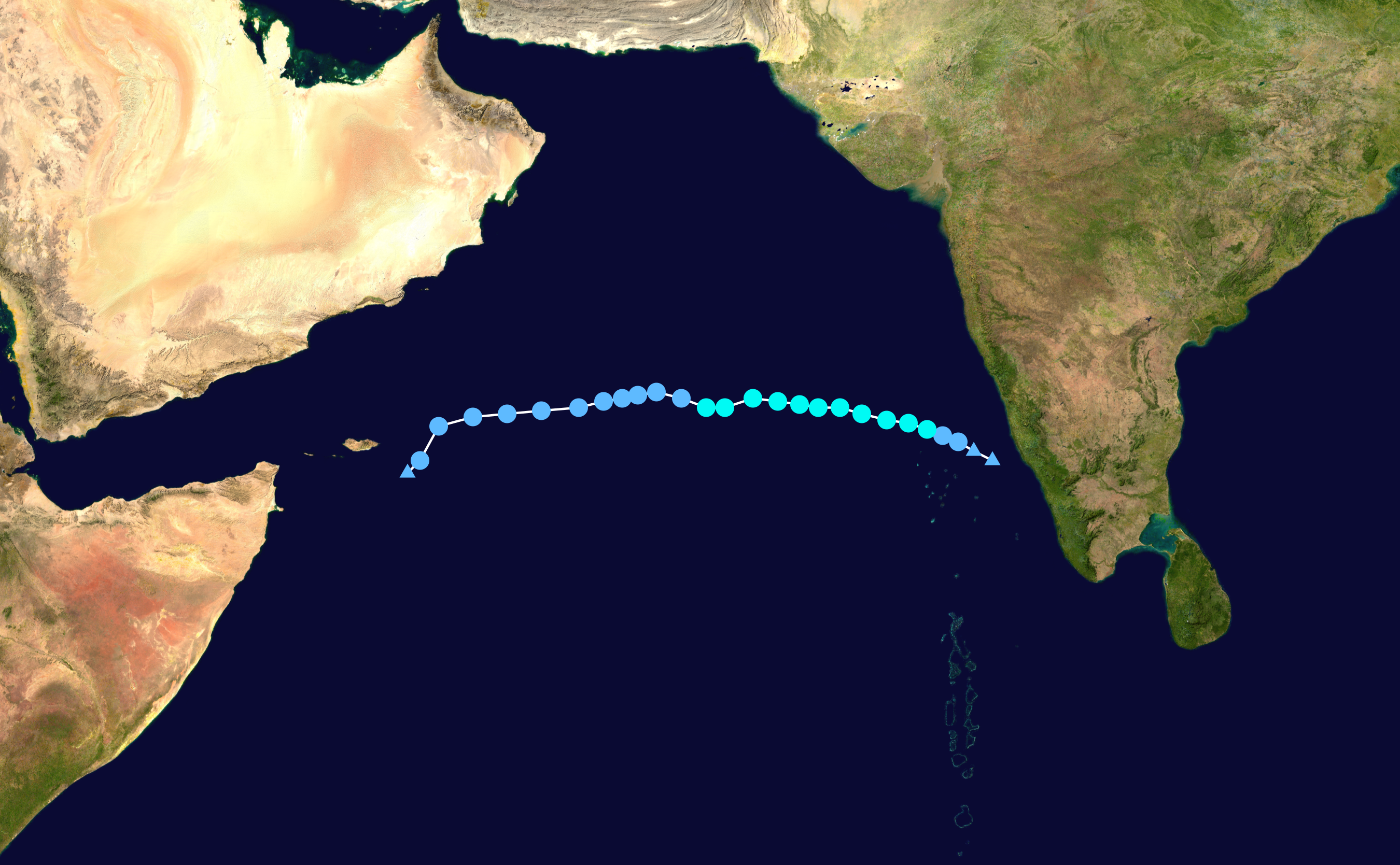
- Duration: 14 December – 17 December
- Peak intensity: 55 km/h (35 mph) (3-min); 1000 hPa (mbar)

On 14 December, the remnants of Cyclone Mandous regenerated into a depression in the Arabian Sea, and it was called ARB 03. The Joint Typhoon Warning Center dubbed it as Invest 97A. Although forecasted to quickly degenerate into a remnant low, ARB 03 intensified into a Deep Depression, according to the Indian Meteorological Department, and the JTWC dubbed it as Cyclone 07A. After reaching peak intensity, the Low-Level Circulation detached from the associated convection as dry air and wind shear increased, starting a weakening trend. It weakened into a low pressure area on 12:00 UTC of 17 December.

=== Depression BOB 10 ===
- Depression (IMD)
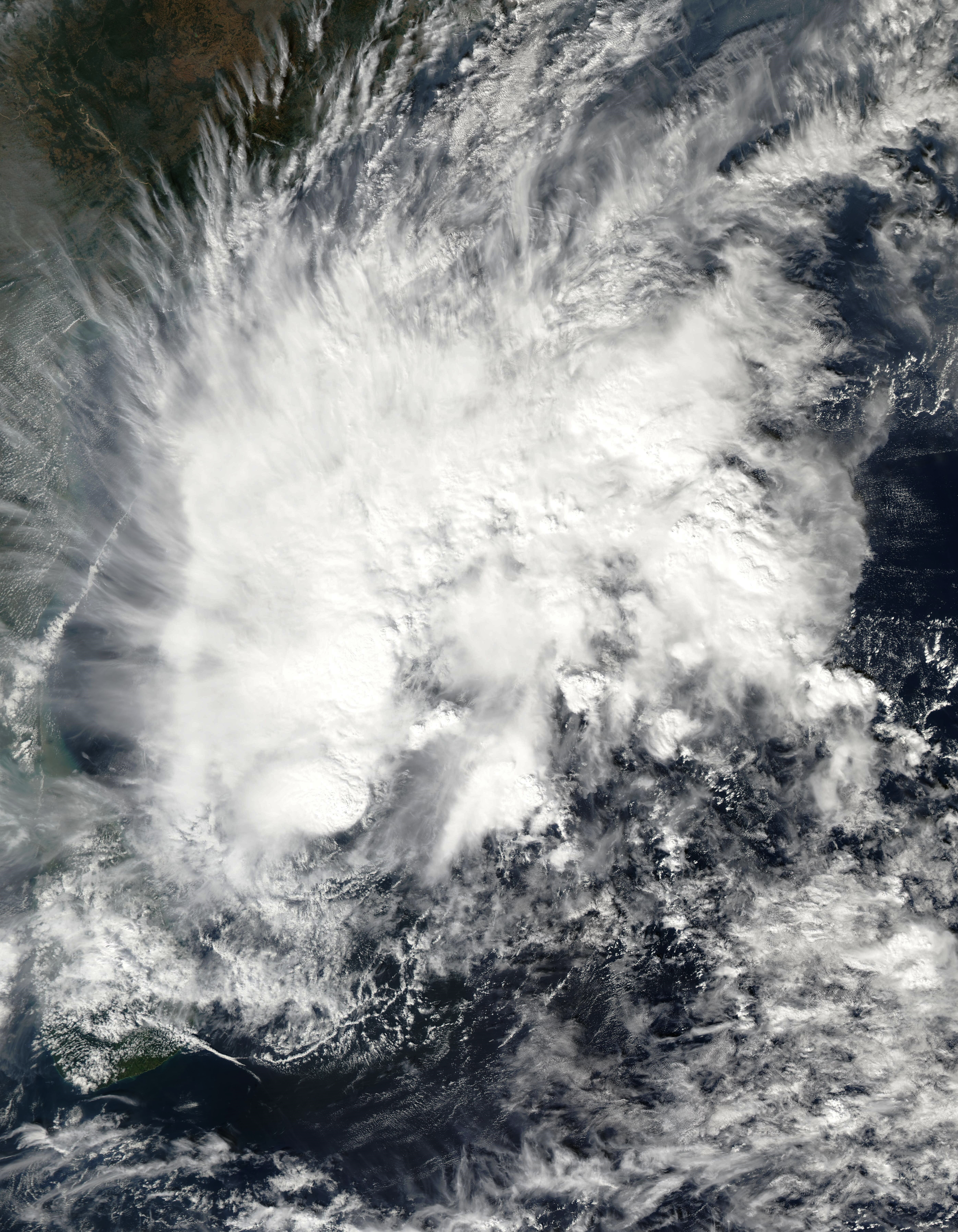
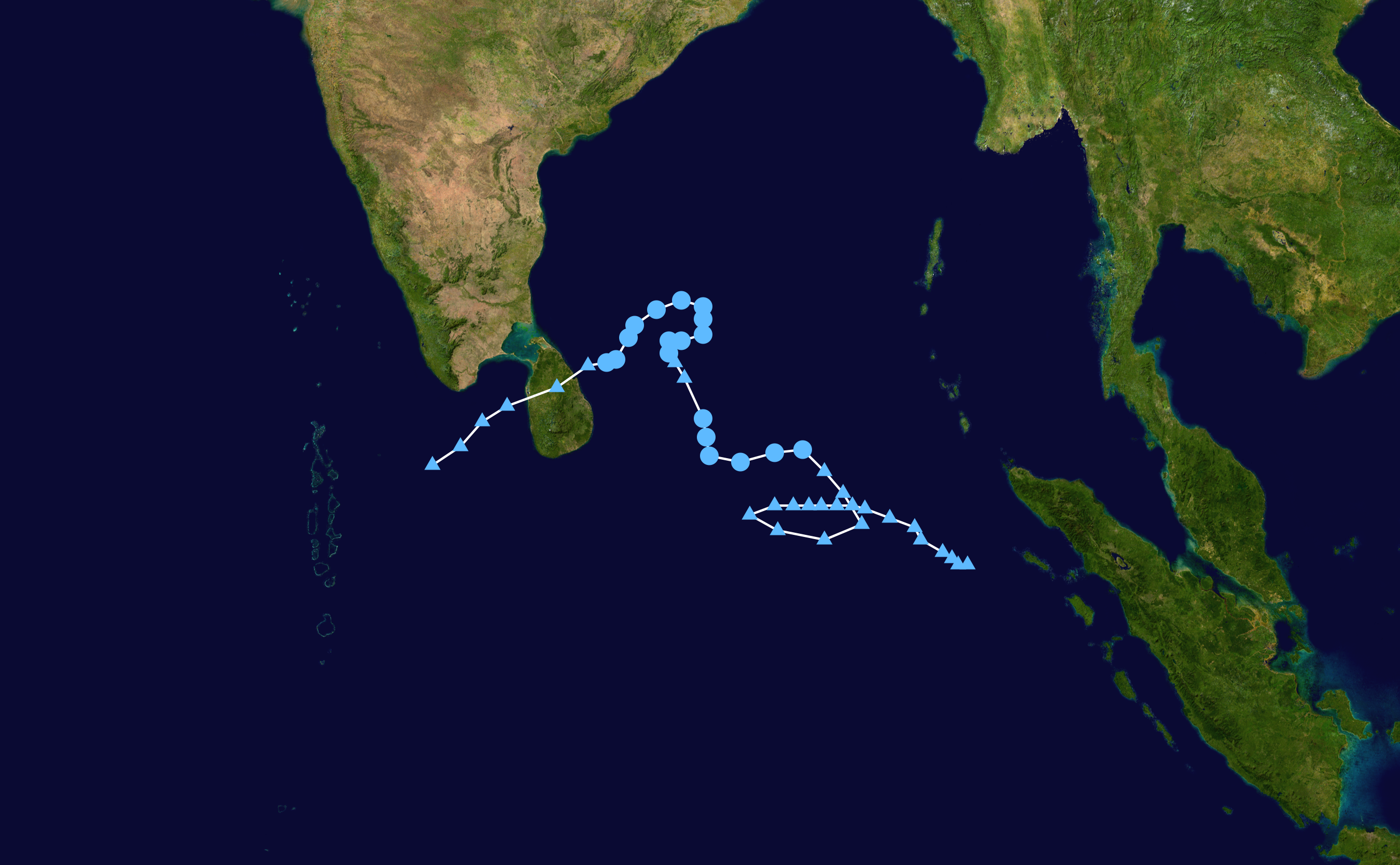
- Duration: 22 December – 27 December
- Peak intensity: 45 km/h (30 mph) (3-min); 1004 hPa (mbar)

On 22 December, the JTWC began tracking a disturbance near Sumatra. It traveled westward before conducting an anticyclonic loop. It traveled north, then west, then north again. By this time, the IMD had already recognized it as a Depression, designating it as BOB 10, while the JTWC designated it as Invest 98B. The JTWC and the IMD assessed BOB 10 and gave it a low chance to develop into a tropical cyclone due to a broad LLC (Low Level Circulation) partially exposed to the southeast of flaring convection that is being sheared to the northwest, and marginally favorable environment. On 25 December, the system weakened further as it approaches the coast of India being a remnant low. The JTWC was still tracking the system, and it made landfall in Northeastern Sri Lanka. The JTWC still gave it a low chance for tropical development, while the IMD said it couldn't develop further. The storm continued to weaken and dissipated southwest of Sri Lanka on 27 December.

BOB 10 gave minor impacts to Sri Lanka.

== Storm names ==
Within this basin, a tropical cyclone is assigned a name when it is judged to have reached Cyclonic Storm intensity with winds of 65 km/h (40 mph). The names were selected by a new list from the Regional Specialized Meteorological Center in New Delhi by mid-year of 2020. There is no retirement of tropical cyclone names in this basin as the list of names is only scheduled to be used once before a new list of names is drawn up. Should a named tropical cyclone move into the basin from the Western Pacific, it will retain its original name. The names which were used for the 2022 season are listed below.

- Asani
- Sitrang
- Mandous

== Season effects ==
This is a table of all storms in the 2022 North Indian Ocean cyclone season. It mentions all of the season's storms and their names, duration, peak intensities according to the IMD storm scale, damage, and death totals. Damage and death totals include the damage and deaths caused when that storm was a precursor wave or extratropical low. All of the damage figures are in 2022 USD.

Name	Dates	Peak intensity			Areas affected	Damage (USD)	Deaths	Ref(s).
Name	Dates	Category	Wind speed	Pressure	Areas affected	Damage (USD)	Deaths	Ref(s).
BOB 01	3–6 March	Deep depression	55 km/h (35 mph)	1002 hPa (29.59 inHg)	Sri Lanka	None	0	
BOB 02	20–23 March	Deep depression	55 km/h (35 mph)	1000 hPa (29.53 inHg)	Andaman and Nicobar Islands, Myanmar	None	0	
Asani	7–12 May	Severe cyclonic storm	100 km/h (65 mph)	982 hPa (29.00 inHg)	Andaman and Nicobar Islands, Andhra Pradesh, Tamil Nadu, Karnataka, Odisha	$323 million	3	
BOB 04	20–21 May	Depression	45 km/h (30 mph)	998 hPa (29.47 inHg)	Myanmar, Thailand	None	0	
ARB 01	16–18 July	Depression	45 km/h (30 mph)	992 hPa (29.29 inHg)	Gujarat	None	0	
LAND 01	9–10 August	Depression	45 km/h (30 mph)	990 hPa (29.23 inHg)	Central India, Odisha	None	0	
ARB 02	12–13 August	Depression	45 km/h (30 mph)	990 hPa (29.23 inHg)	Gujarat, Oman	None	0	
BOB 05	14–17 August	Depression	45 km/h (30 mph)	994 hPa (29.35 inHg)	Central India, Rajasthan, Odisha, West Bengal	None	0	
BOB 06	18–23 August	Deep depression	55 km/h (35 mph)	992 hPa (29.29 inHg)	Bangladesh, Jharkhand, Odisha, Rajasthan, West Bengal, Central India, Uttar Pradesh	$15.8 million	32	
LAND 02	11–12 September	Depression	45 km/h (30 mph)	998 hPa (29.47 inHg)	Chhattisgarh, Odisha, West Bengal	None	0	
Sitrang	22–25 October	Cyclonic storm	85 km/h (50 mph)	994 hPa (29.35 inHg)	Andaman and Nicobar Islands, West Bengal, Odisha, Jharkhand, Meghalaya, Assam, Tripura, Bangladesh	$105 million	35	
BOB 08	20–24 November	Depression	45 km/h (30 mph)	1003 hPa (29.62 inHg)	Andhra Pradesh, Tamil Nadu, Karnataka	None	0	
Mandous	6–10 December	Severe cyclonic storm	95 km/h (60 mph)	990 hPa (29.23 inHg)	Andaman and Nicobar Islands, Sri Lanka, Tamil Nadu	$27.4 million	9	
ARB 03	14–17 December	Deep depression	55 km/h (35 mph)	1000 hPa (29.53 inHg)	None	None	0	
BOB 10	22–27 December	Depression	45 km/h (30 mph)	1004 hPa (29.65 inHg)	Sri Lanka	None	0	
Season aggregates
15 systems	March 3 – December 27		100 km/h (65 mph)	982 hPa (29.00 inHg)		$471 million	79	

== See also ==
- Weather of 2022
- Tropical cyclones in 2022
- North Indian Ocean cyclone season
- 2022 Atlantic hurricane season
- 2022 Pacific hurricane season
- 2022 Pacific typhoon season
- South-West Indian Ocean cyclone seasons: 2021–22, 2022–23
- Australian region cyclone seasons: 2021–22, 2022–23
- South Pacific cyclone seasons: 2021–22, 2022–23
