= 2022 Odisha floods =

Natural disasters in India

2022 Odisha Floods
- Date: 14 August 2022 to 7 September 2022
- Deaths: 7
- Property damage: ~ ₹126 crore (~$15,390,200)

The 2022 Odisha floods were a series of floods in Odisha, which lasted from 14 August 2022 to 7 September 2022.

The main causes for the floods were the extensive rains which were started from the 3rd week of August 2022, because of the formation of 3 depression systems over the Bay of Bengal in that month and the Monsoon rains.

In total twelve districts, Khordha, Cuttack, Jagatsinghpur, Kendrapara, Puri, Balasore, Mayurbhanj, Subarnapur (Sonepur), Bargarh, Angul, Boudh and Sambalpur, were primarily affected by the floods.

The long term causes for the floods in Odisha are the extensive erosion, unpredictable rainfall, improper maintenance of river embankments, excessive building of dams on the rivers and aperiodic release of river water from the dams.

== Impact ==
On 14 August 2022, the India Meteorological Department (IMD) issued a "Red Alert" of heavy, very heavy, and extreme rainfall for seven districts in Odisha due to the new forming Depression in the Bay of Bengal. After that, extensive rainfall started across many areas of the state, causing the water in the Mahanadi river system to flow at danger levels.

Meanwhile, the dams in Chhattisgarh and Jharkhand were opened due to which the water present in the Hirakud Dam Reservoir started overflowing. Therefore, the Hirakud Dam Authority opened 40 gates to release the excess water from the reservoir. Due to the sudden release of floodwater from the dam, 100 houses in Sambalpur located near to the river got submerged in the floodwater.

The water released from the dam increased the water levels and the flow rate of the Mahanadi river system. In addition to the monsoon rains, the situation of the Mahanadi, Brahmani, Baitarani River Systems and other rivers in the state worsened.

On 17 August 2022, the Indian Meteorological Department (IMD) issued a "Yellow Alert" of heavy rainfall for 20 districts and an "Orange Alert" of very heavy rainfall for 17 districts. IMD warned the state government of a new forming depression over the Bay of Bengal and advised fishermen not to venture into the sea for fishing, as the winds were blowing at 45–55 km/h.

The low-lying districts in the Mahanadi River Basin - Jagatsinghpur, Cuttack, Khordha, Puri and Kendrapara - were flooded with 12 lakh cusec of water, which flowed through these areas on the night of 19 August 2022.

In Jharkhand, the 16 gates of the Galudih Barrage were opened and released 6 lakh cusec of water. Due to this, excess water flowed into the Subarnarekha River and flowed further into the Northern districts of Odisha like Balasore and Mayurbhanj and flooded these areas.

Heavy rains also occurred in Bhubaneswar, causing low-lying areas of the city like Sundarpada to get submerged by the rainwater; many drains, roads and old houses were damaged.

Due to the floods, over 1.2 lakh hectares of cropland were destroyed or damaged, leading to huge losses for farmers. The most affected croplands were in the Puri, Kendrapara, Jagatsinghpur, Cuttack, Boudh and Sonepur districts.

== Aftermath ==
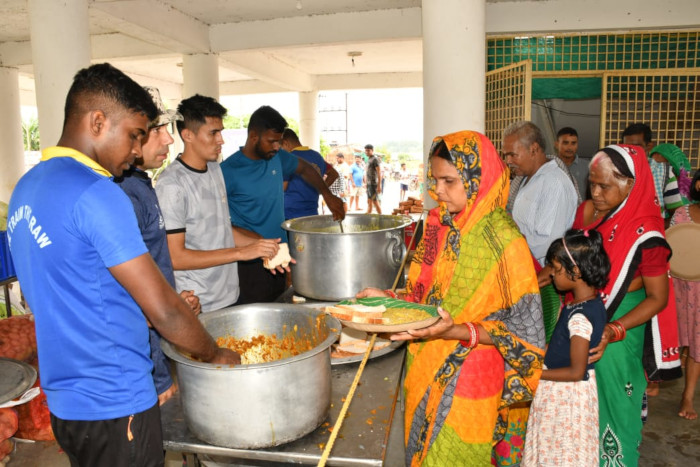
Indian Navy Service (INS) Chilka distributing food to the people who were sheltered in relief centers.

In total around one million people from 1,757 villages were affected, 126,000 hectares of crop land was damaged, 250,000 people were marooned, seven killed, over 14,000 houses were damaged and destroyed by the floods, 440 relief centers were established and ₹126 crore of public property got damaged and destroyed.

Due to the crop damage, prices of affected vegetables increased noticeably and supply chains were affected.

Over 900 cases of diarrhea and 88 cases of snakebite were reported from the flood-hit districts.

Several diarrhea cases were reported, as many people were forced to drink flood water as they didn't have access to any freshwater resource.

On 18 August 2022, Odisha Chief Minister Naveen Patnaik conducted an aerial survey over the Jagatsinghpur, Kendrapara and Puri districts, and later announced a 15-day relief for the Jagatsinghpur, Kendrapara, Khordha, Puri and Cuttack districts and 7-day relief to Sambalpur, Bargarh, Boudh, Sonepur and Angul districts.

The Odisha Government later dispatched financial aid of ₹128.8 crore to restore the damaged and destroyed public properties and to conduct relief operations in the flood-hit areas.

To conduct relief operations, 11 teams of National Disaster Response Force (NDRF), 12 teams of Odisha Disaster Rapid Action Force (ODRF) and 52 teams of Odisha Fire Services were arranged in the flood-hit Districts.
