= Storm Anthony =

Storm Anthony may refer to:

- Tropical Cyclone Anthony, a storm during the 2010–11 Australian region cyclone season
- Storm Antoni, a storm in the 2022–23 European windstorm season, and the first to be named by the Met Office that season
- Hurricane Anthony, an episode from season 2 of the US television series CSI: Miami

== See also ==
- List of storms named Tony
