= List of storms named Tony =

The name Tony has been used for two tropical cyclones worldwide: one in the Atlantic Ocean and one in the Australian region.

In the Atlantic:

- Tropical Storm Tony (2012) – did not affect land

In the Australian region:

- Cyclone Tony (1979) – a Category 2 tropical cyclone that did not affect land

== See also ==
- Cyclone Anthony (2011) – an Australian region tropical cyclone with a similar name
