= 2010–11 Australian region cyclone season =

Tropical cyclone season

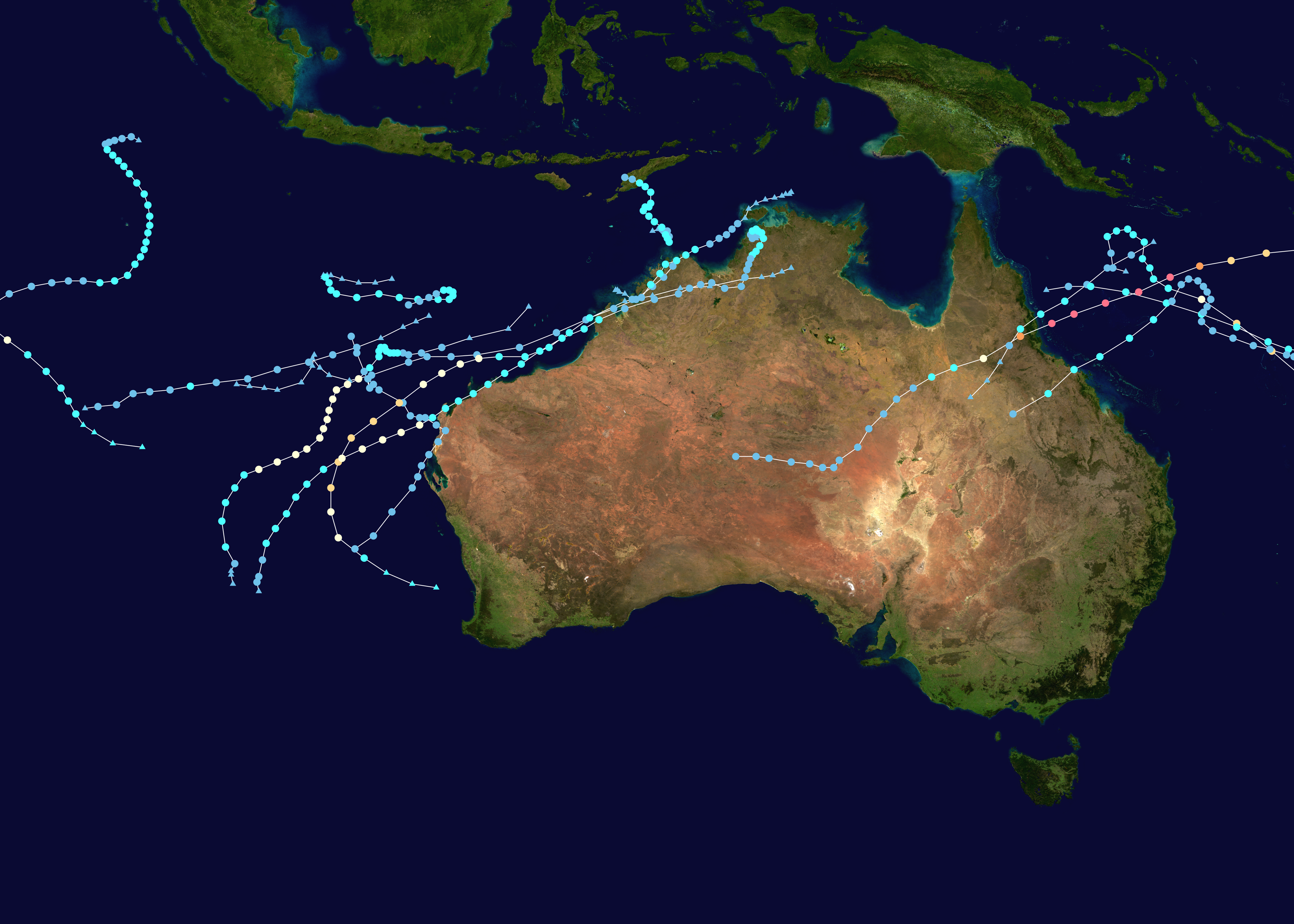
- Season summary map

Seasonal boundaries
- First system formed: 28 October 2010
- Last system dissipated: 18 April 2011

Strongest storm
- Name: Yasi
  - Maximum winds: 205 km/h (125 mph) (10-minute sustained)
  - Lowest pressure: 929 hPa (mbar)

Seasonal statistics
- Tropical lows: 28 (Note: Number of tropical lows excludes Tropical Low 24U, which was monitored outside of the basin.)
- Tropical cyclones: 11
- Severe tropical cyclones: 6
- Total fatalities: 3 total
- Total damage: $3.62 billion (2011 USD)

Related articles
- 2010–11 South-West Indian Ocean cyclone season; 2010–11 South Pacific cyclone season

The 2010–11 Australian region cyclone season was a near average tropical cyclone season, with eleven tropical cyclones forming compared to an average of 12. The season was also the costliest recorded in the Australian region basin, with a total of $3.62 billion (2011 USD) in damages, mostly from the destructive Cyclone Yasi. The season began on 1 November 2010 and ended on 30 April 2011, although the first tropical cyclone formed on 28 October. The Australian region is defined as being to the south of the equator, between the 90th meridian east and 160th meridian east. Tropical cyclones in this area are monitored by five Tropical Cyclone Warning Centres (TCWC's): Jakarta, Port Moresby, Perth, Darwin, and Brisbane, each of which have the power to name a tropical cyclone. The TCWC's in Perth, Darwin, and Brisbane are run by the Bureau of Meteorology, who designate significant tropical lows with a number and the U suffix. The Joint Typhoon Warning Center also issues unofficial warnings for the region, designating significant tropical cyclones with the "S" suffix when they form west of 135°E, and the "P" suffix when they form east of 135°E.

== Seasonal forecasts ==
TSR forecasts Date	Tropical storms	Severe Tropical cyclones	Landfalling cyclones	ACE	Ref
Average (1975/76–2009/10)	10.5	5.5	4.5	79	
5 May 2010	9.3	4.9	4	–	
6 July 2010	12.5	6.7	5.2	–	
6 September 2010	15.1	8.1	6.1	108	
9 November 2010	15.4	8.3	6.2	111	
6 December 2010	15.5	8.3	6.2	111	
Region	Average	Chance of Above average	Predicted activity	Actual activity	Ref
Whole	12	98%	20–22	10	
Western	7	93%	11–12	6	
North-Western	4	67%	5	5	
Northern	6	75%	7–8	0	
Eastern	4	87%	6–7	4	
	Forecast Center	Tropical lows	Tropical cyclones	Severe tropical cyclones	Ref
Actual activity:	BoM	28	10	5	
Actual activity:	JTWC	13	13	5	

Ahead of the cyclone season, the Bureau of Meteorology (BoM), the New Zealand National Institute of Water and Atmospheric Research (NIWA) and various other Pacific Meteorological services, all contributed towards the Island Climate Update tropical cyclone outlook that was released during October 2010. The outlook took into account the moderate-strong La Niña conditions that had been observed across the Pacific and analogue seasons that had La Niña conditions occurring during the season. The outlook called for a normal or above average number of tropical cyclone occurring during the season, with nine to twelve named tropical cyclones, to occur between 135°E and 120°W compared to an average of nine. At least three of the tropical cyclones were expected to become category 3 severe tropical cyclones, while one was expected to become a category 4 severe tropical cyclone. In addition to contributing towards the Island Climate Update outlook, the BoM issued seven seasonal forecasts during October 2010, for the Australian region and the Southern Pacific with each forecast covering the whole tropical cyclone year. Each forecast issued took into account the La Niña conditions that had developed over the region and were forecasted to persist during the season.

For the Australian region as a whole it was predicted that the season could be the most active season since 1983–84 and that between 20 – 22 tropical cyclones would either develop within or move into the basin compared to an average of 12 cyclones. For the Western region between 90°E and 125°E, the BoM forecast that the area would see between 11 and 12 tropical cyclones compared to the average of 7, it was also noted that the region had a 93% chance of an above average cyclone season. For the North-Western subregion between 105°E and 130°E, it was predicted that activity would be above average, with 5 tropical cyclones and a 67% chance of above average tropical cyclone activity. TCWC Perth also noted that there was a likelihood of two tropical cyclones and a significant likelihood of at least one severe tropical cyclone impacting Western Australia. It was also noted that there was an increased chance of an early season cyclone and a system impacting Western Australia before Christmas 2010. It was predicted that the Northern Territory between 125°E and 142.5°E had a 75% chance of an above average season, and that the first cyclone of the season over the Territory and the monsoon onset would be expected to be earlier than normal. The Eastern region between 142.5°E and 160°E had an 87% chance of an above average season, with 7–8 tropical cyclones predicted for the region compared to an average of 6. The BoM also issued forecasts for the Western Southern Pacific region, between 142.5°E and 165°E and the Eastern Southern Pacific region between 165°E and 120°W. It was predicted that the Western Southern Pacific would have a 79% chance of having an above average season with 7–8 tropical cyclones occurring within the region, compared to an average of 5 tropical cyclones. The Eastern Southern Pacific region was predicted to have a 33% chance of having an above average season and 5–6 tropical cyclones compared to an average of 7 tropical cyclones.

The Guy Carpenter Asia-Pacific Climate Impact Centre (GCACIC) at the City University of Hong Kong and the Tropical Storm Risk Consortium (TSR) at the University College London also issued seasonal forecasts for the region.

== Seasonal summary ==
During the middle of October, the Madden-Julian Oscillation (MJO) moved through the eastern Indian Ocean and left an area of enhanced atmospheric convection in its wake. This subsequently combined with an equatorial Rossby wave, which contributed to the formation of Tropical Low 01U to the southwest of Sumatra, Indonesia on 28 October 2010. Over the next couple of days, the system moved westwards before it recurved south-eastwards during 30 October.

== Systems ==
=== Tropical Low Anggrek ===
- Tropical low (Australian scale)
- Tropical storm (SSHWS)
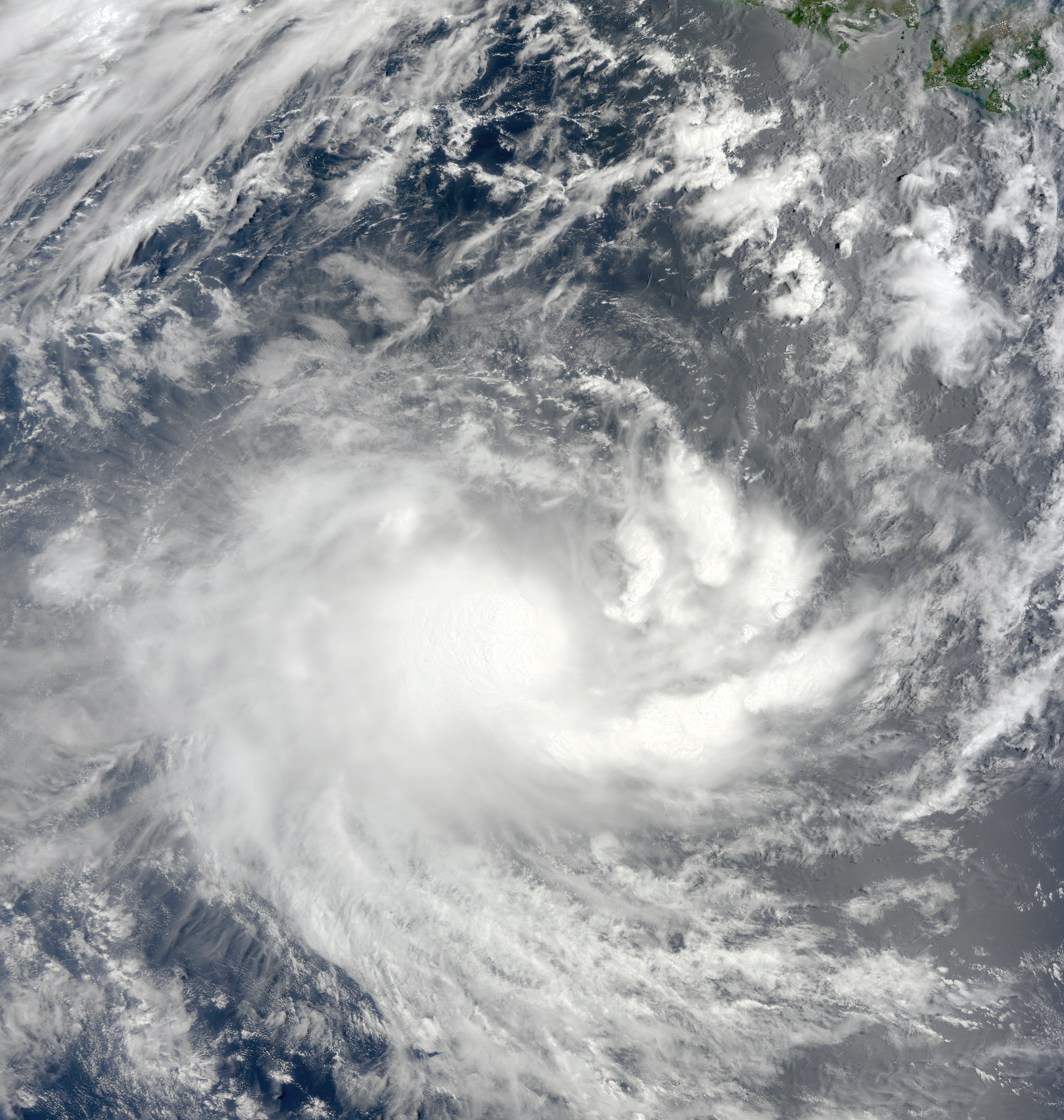
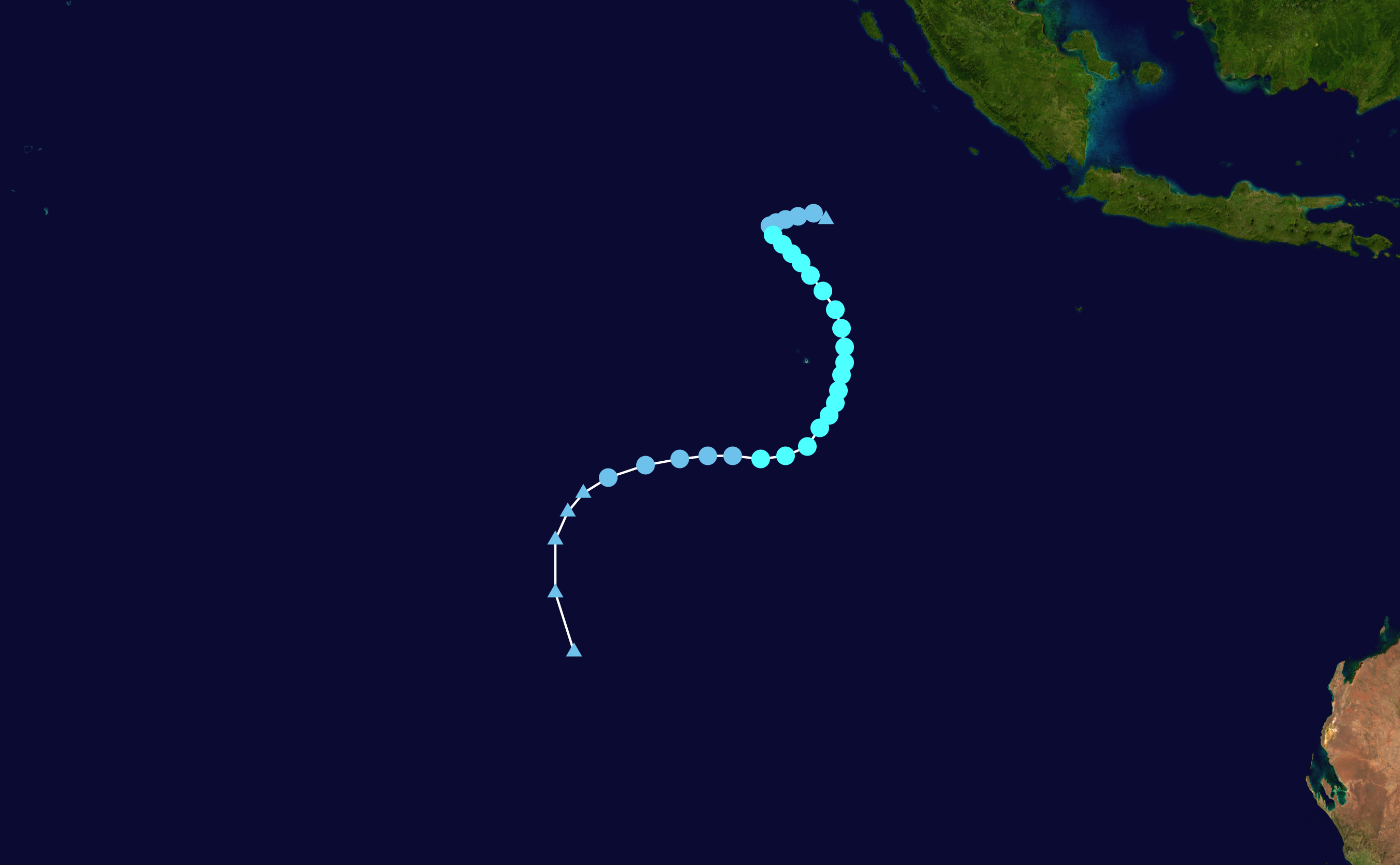
- Duration: 28 October – 4 November
- Peak intensity: 75 km/h (45 mph) (10-min); 995 hPa (mbar)

Tropical Low 01U was first noted by the BoM and BMKG during 28 October, while it was located to the southwest of Sumatra, Indonesia. Over the next day, the system moved slowly westwards, as atmospheric convection started to wrap into its consolidating low-level circulation centre, in an area of light to moderate vertical wind shear. The JTWC subsequently issued a tropical cyclone formation alert on the system during the following day, as the system turned southwards and interacted with a mid-level trough of low pressure.

On 30 October, the JTWC began issuing advisories on the system, designating it as Tropical Cyclone 02S. The next day, TCWC Jakarta reported that the low had intensified into a category 1 tropical cyclone on the Australian scale, naming it "Anggrek". Later that day, as the system moved towards the southeast, it entered the BoM's area of responsibility as it further intensified into a category 2 tropical cyclone. Anggrek passed to the east of the Cocos (Keeling) Islands early on 2 November, with the system beginning a weakening trend soon afterwards. On 4 November, TCWC Perth issued the final advisory on the system as Anggrek weakened into a tropical low. The next day, the remnants of Anggrek entered the south-west Indian Ocean as a convective-less circulation center.

Throughout the Cocos (Keeling) Islands, heavy rain and gusty winds were experienced as Cyclone Anggrek passed. Only minor damage was reported, with several trees and power lines brought down. No deaths were reported across the islands. Operationally, Anggrek peaked as a minimal tropical cyclone, however, in TCWC Perth's post-season analysis, Anggrek was downgraded to a tropical low as gale-force winds never extended more than halfway around the system center.

=== Tropical Cyclone Abele ===
- Category 2 tropical cyclone (Australian scale)
- Category 1 tropical cyclone (SSHWS)
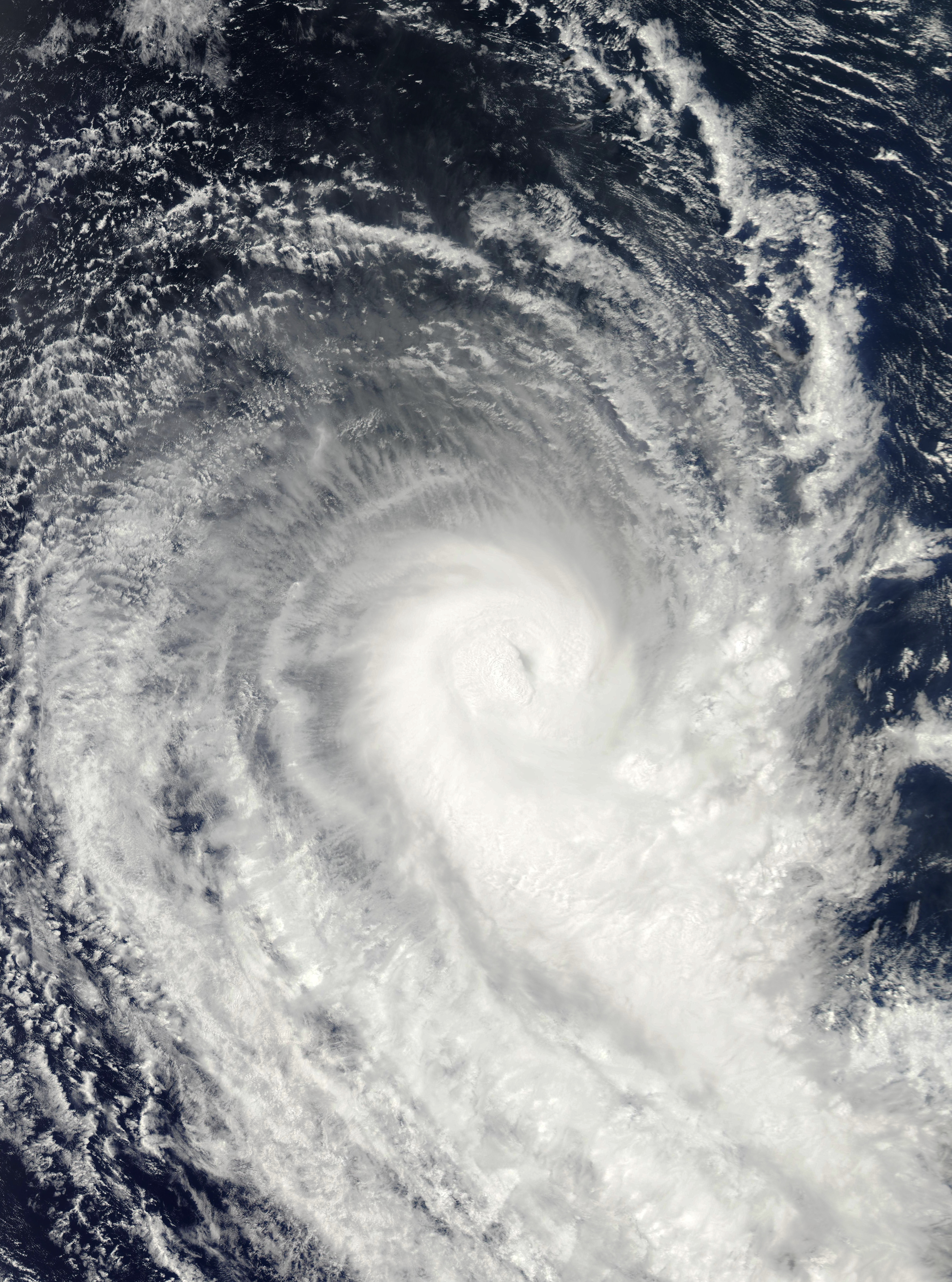
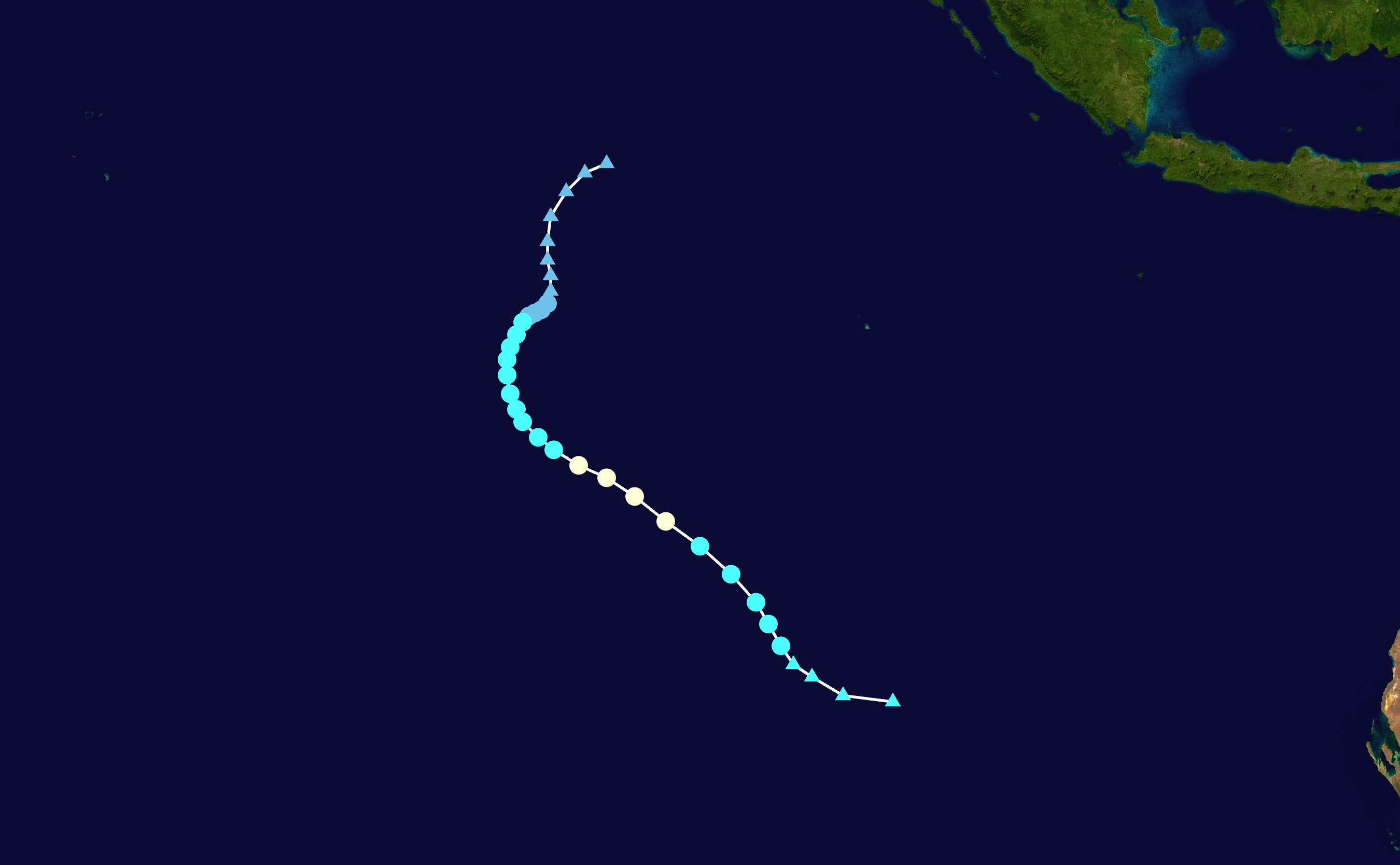
- Duration: 3 December (Entered basin) – 5 December
- Peak intensity: 95 km/h (60 mph) (10-min); 987 hPa (mbar)

During 3 December, the BoM reported that Tropical Cyclone Abele had moved into the Australian Region from the South-West Indian Ocean, as a category 2 tropical cyclone with 10-minute sustained winds of 95 km/h (60 mph). As it entered the region the system was located well to the southwest of the Cocos (Keeling) Islands, with the JTWC reporting that the system was equivalent to a category 1 hurricane with 1-minute sustained windspeeds of 120 km/h (75 mph). Over the next day Abele weakened further because of cooler sea surface temperatures and increasing vertical wind shear, before it was last noted by both the BoM and JTWC during 5 December.

=== Tropical Low 03U ===
- Tropical low (Australian scale)
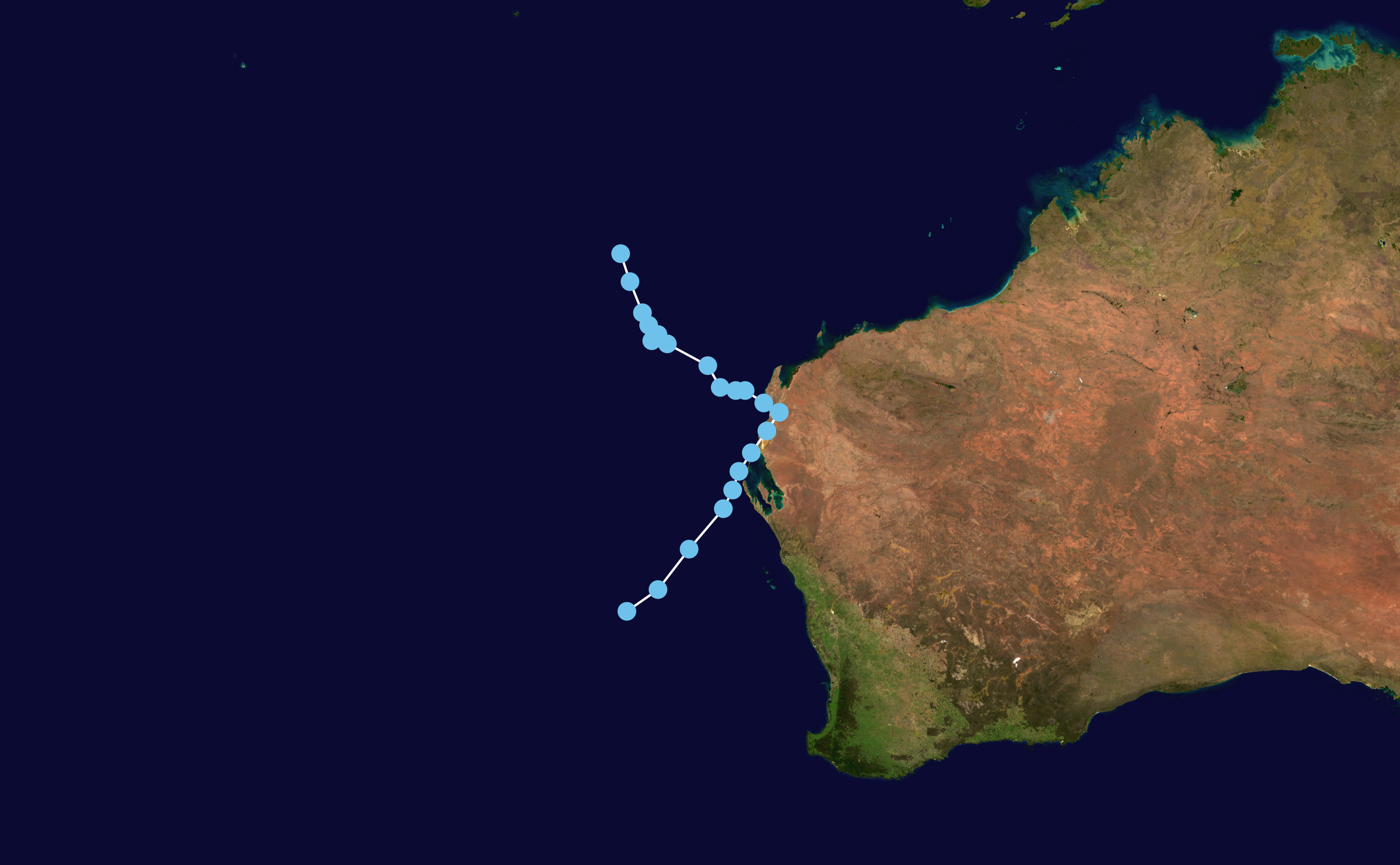
- Duration: 15 December – 20 December
- Peak intensity: 55 km/h (35 mph) (10-min); 989 hPa (mbar)

On 15 December a monsoonal low developed about 500 km north-west of Exmouth, Western Australia. The system drifted slowly to the south-east. Gales and heavy rain reached areas far from the centre of the system which crossed the coast near Coral Bay on 18 December. However, shortly after landfall the system turned sharply to the south-west and reached the Indian Ocean west of Carnarvon on 19 December. It moved away from the coast and dissipated late on 20 December some 500 km west of Geraldton.

In the catchment basin of the Gascoyne River heavy precipitation fell from 16 to 19 December and triggered one of the worst floods along the Gascoyne River in history. The rain also affected other river basins in the area, such as Wooramel, Murchison, Lyndon-Minilya, and Ashburton rivers. For the period from 16 to 20 December some stations reported up to 300 mm cumulated precipitation which is equivalent to the normal annual rainfall amount. The highest 24 hours rainfall was reported at Carnarvon Airport on 17 December. During that day 207.8 mm fell which set an all-time record since recording began in 1883 with the previous record 119.4 mm set on 24 March 1923.

Preliminary estimates placed damage at A$100 million (US$100.4 million) with at least 2000 head of cattle lost in the flood.

=== Tropical Cyclone Tasha ===
- Category 1 tropical cyclone (Australian scale)
- Tropical storm (SSHWS)
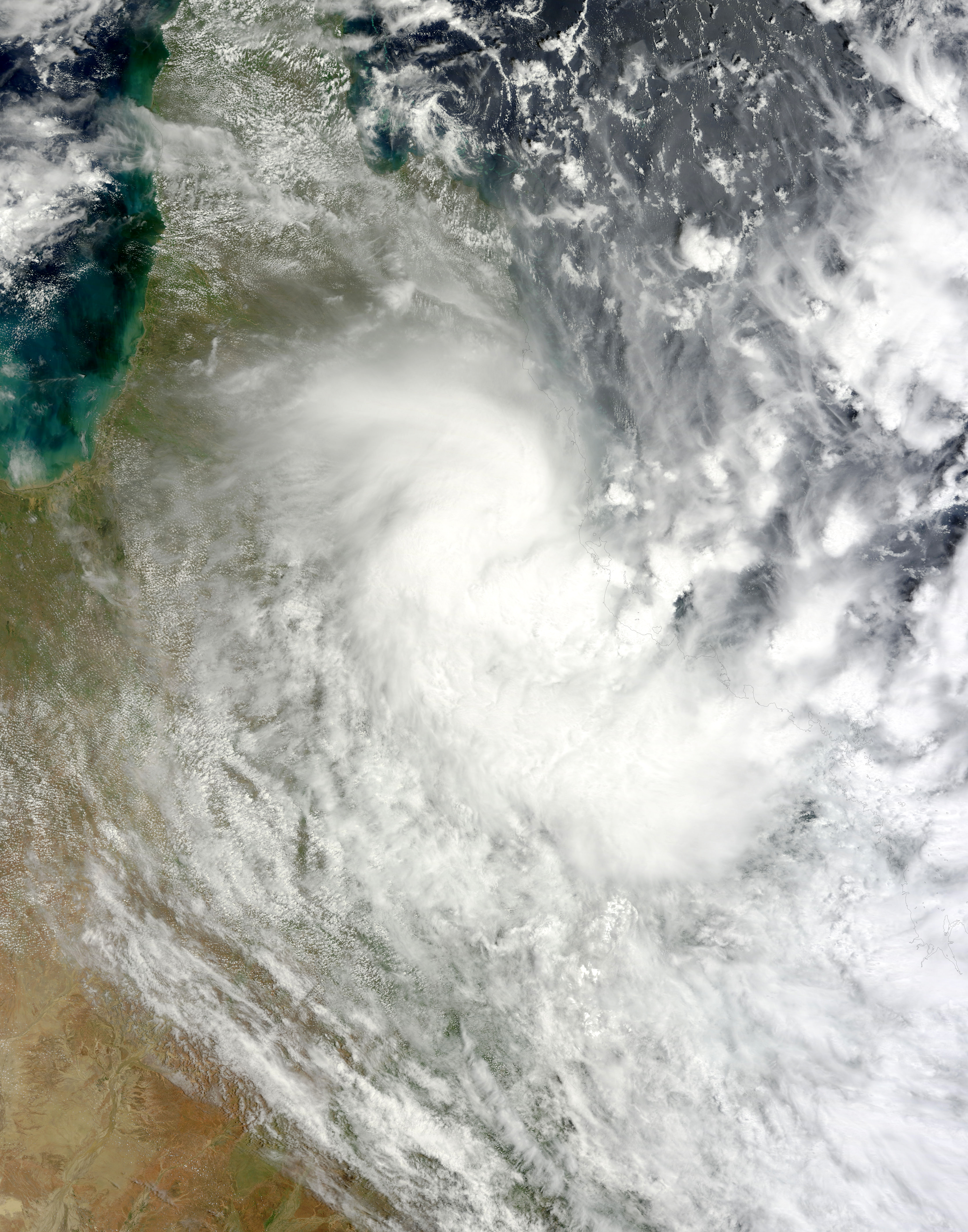
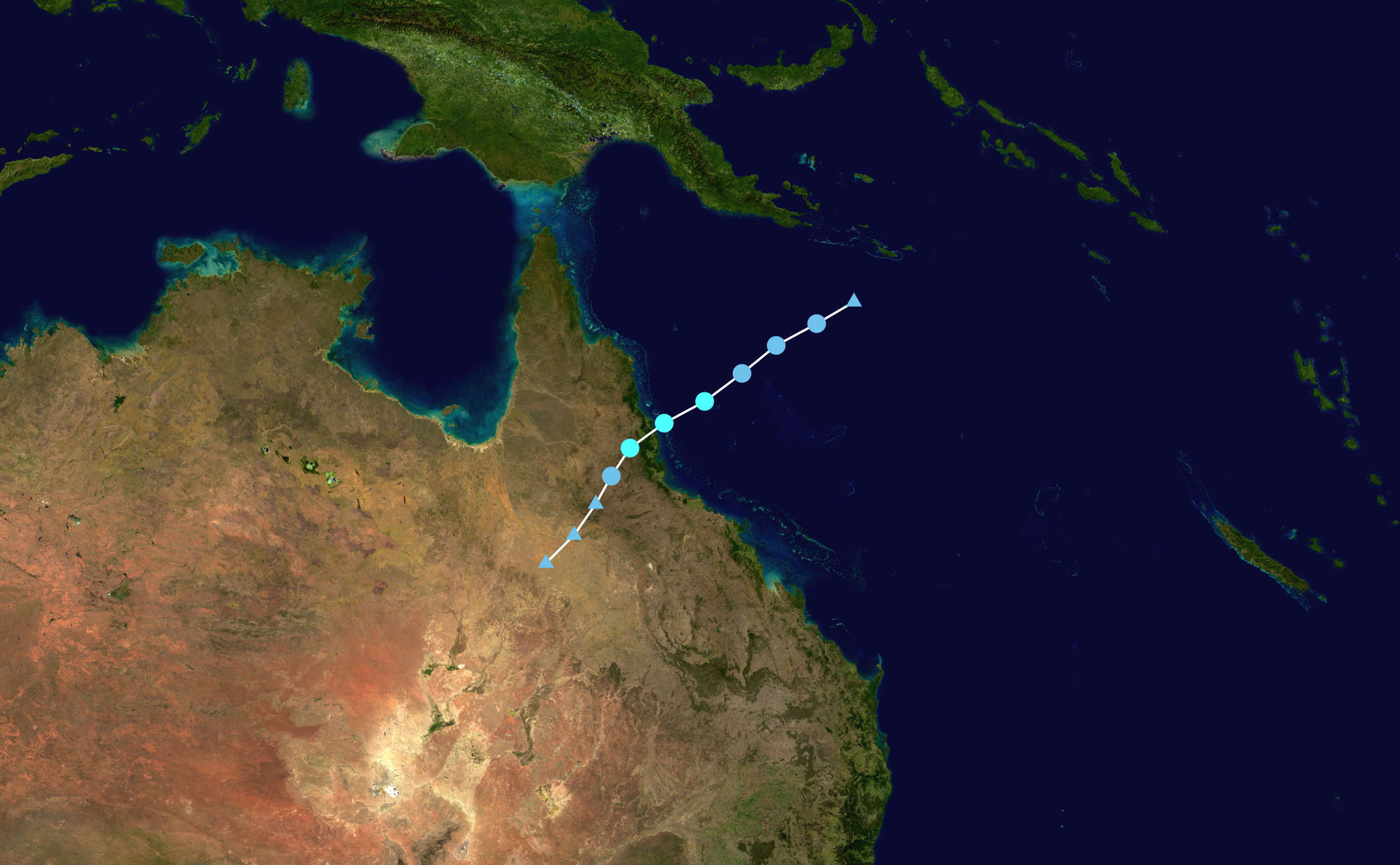
- Duration: 20 December – 25 December
- Peak intensity: 75 km/h (45 mph) (10-min); 993 hPa (mbar)

Tropical Cyclone Tasha was first identified on 24 December 2010 by the Joint Typhoon Warning Centre (JTWC) as a weak area of low pressure accompanied by increasing deep convection. Situated roughly 370 kilometres (230 mi) east-northeast of Cairns, Queensland, favourable environmental conditions, such as low wind shear, would allow for further development of the low. Later on 24 December, the Australian Bureau of Meteorology (BOM) classified the system as a tropical low. Shortly thereafter, the system rapidly consolidated as deep convection formed around a well-defined low-level circulation. This prompted the JTWC to issue a Tropical Cyclone Formation Alert as they anticipated the system to intensify into a tropical cyclone within the following 24 hours. At 16:00 UTC, the BOM upgraded the low to a Category 1 cyclone, assigning with the name Tasha. Within hours of the BoM declaring Tasha a tropical cyclone, the JTWC followed suit and issued their first advisory on the storm, designating it as Tropical Cyclone 04P. Situated along the northwestern edge of a subtropical ridge, Tasha tracked southwestward towards Queensland, Australia and intensified. The storm attained its peak intensity on 24 December with winds of 75 km/h (45 mph) and a barometric pressure of 993 mbar (hPa; 29.32 inHg). Hours later, the centre of Tasha made landfall between Cairns and Innisfail at this intensity. Later that day, the BOM issued their final advisory on Tasha as it weakened to a tropical low over Queensland; the JTWC followed suit shortly thereafter. The remnants of Tasha persisted in the region for several more days, bringing heavy rains to much of Queensland.

While making landfall, Tasha produced rainfall of about 100 mm in the space of an hour. Tasha contributed to floods across Queensland that forced the evacuation of thousands of people from towns and cities. Damage from associated flooding was estimated at A$1 billion.

=== Tropical Low 06U ===
- Tropical low (Australian scale)
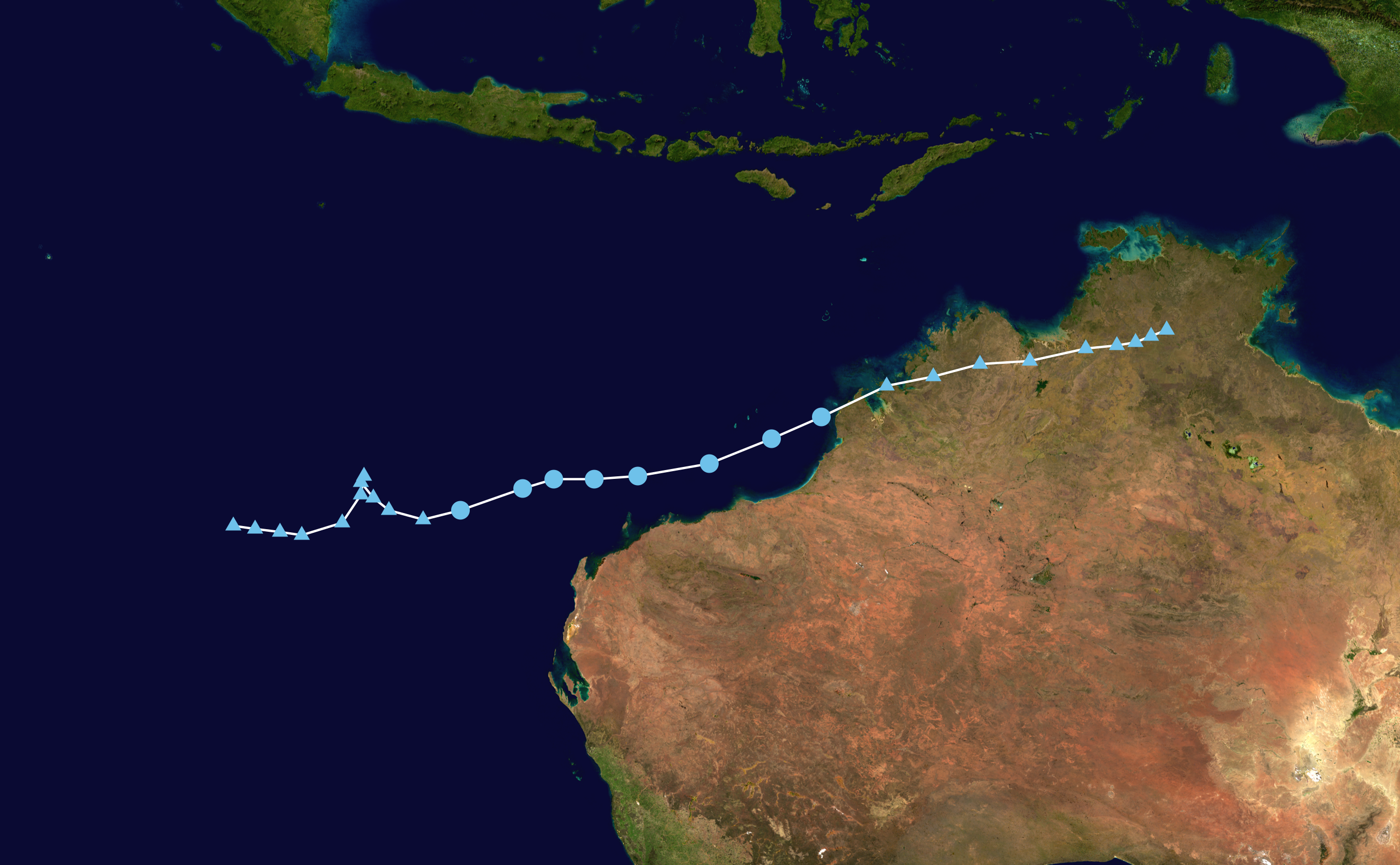
- Duration: 29 December – 5 January
- Peak intensity: 55 km/h (35 mph) (10-min); 993 hPa (mbar)

On 30 December, TCWC Perth started issuing advisories on Tropical Low 06U that had developed inland over the Top End of Western Australia. On 1 January, when 06U had emerged over the Indian Ocean waters, it was forecast that it would intensify into a tropical cyclone, though shear had caused the low to struggle to develop. TCWC Perth issued its final advisory the next day as 06U weakened to a low-pressure area.

=== Tropical Cyclone Vince ===
- Category 1 tropical cyclone (Australian scale)
- Tropical storm (SSHWS)
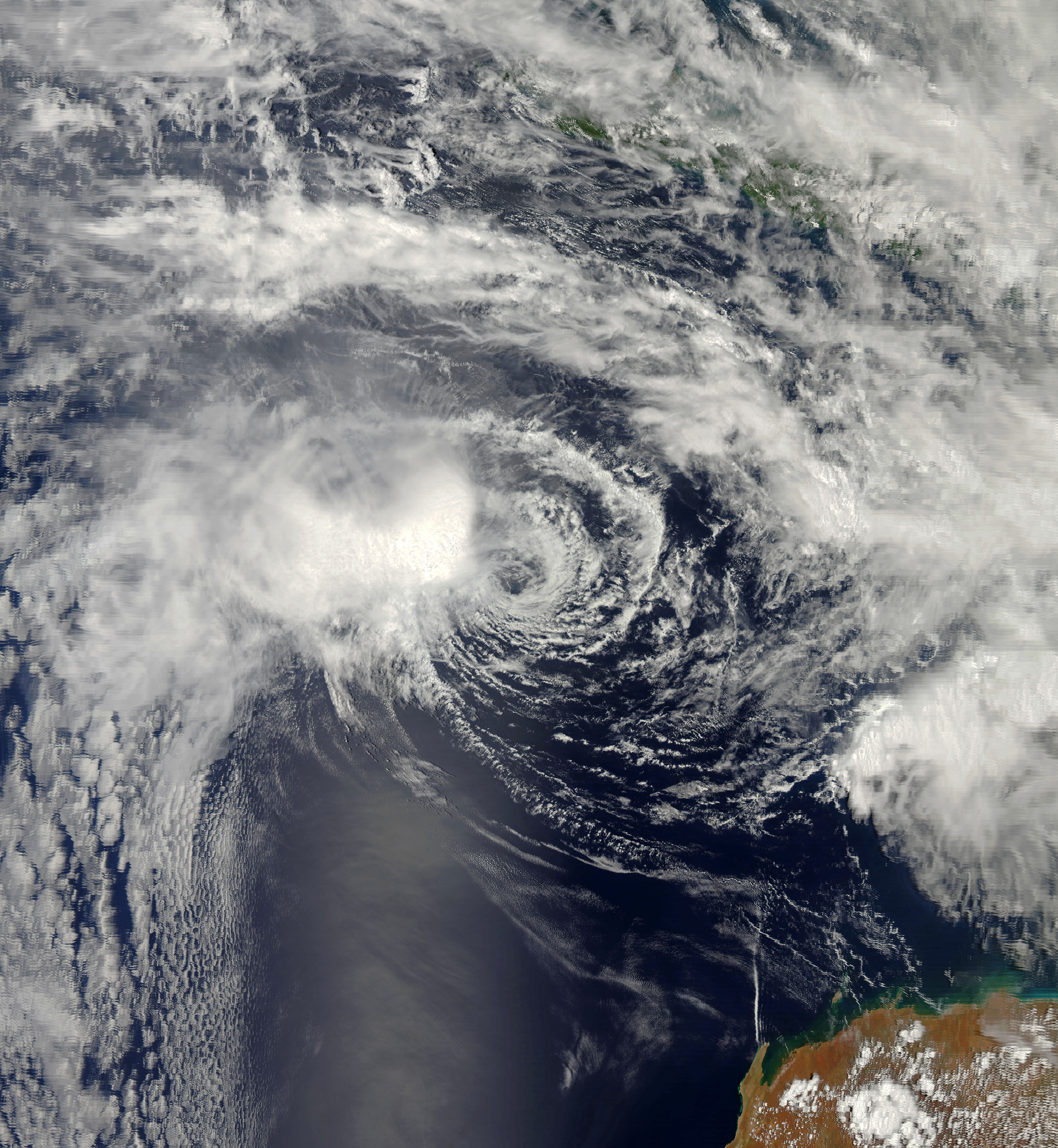
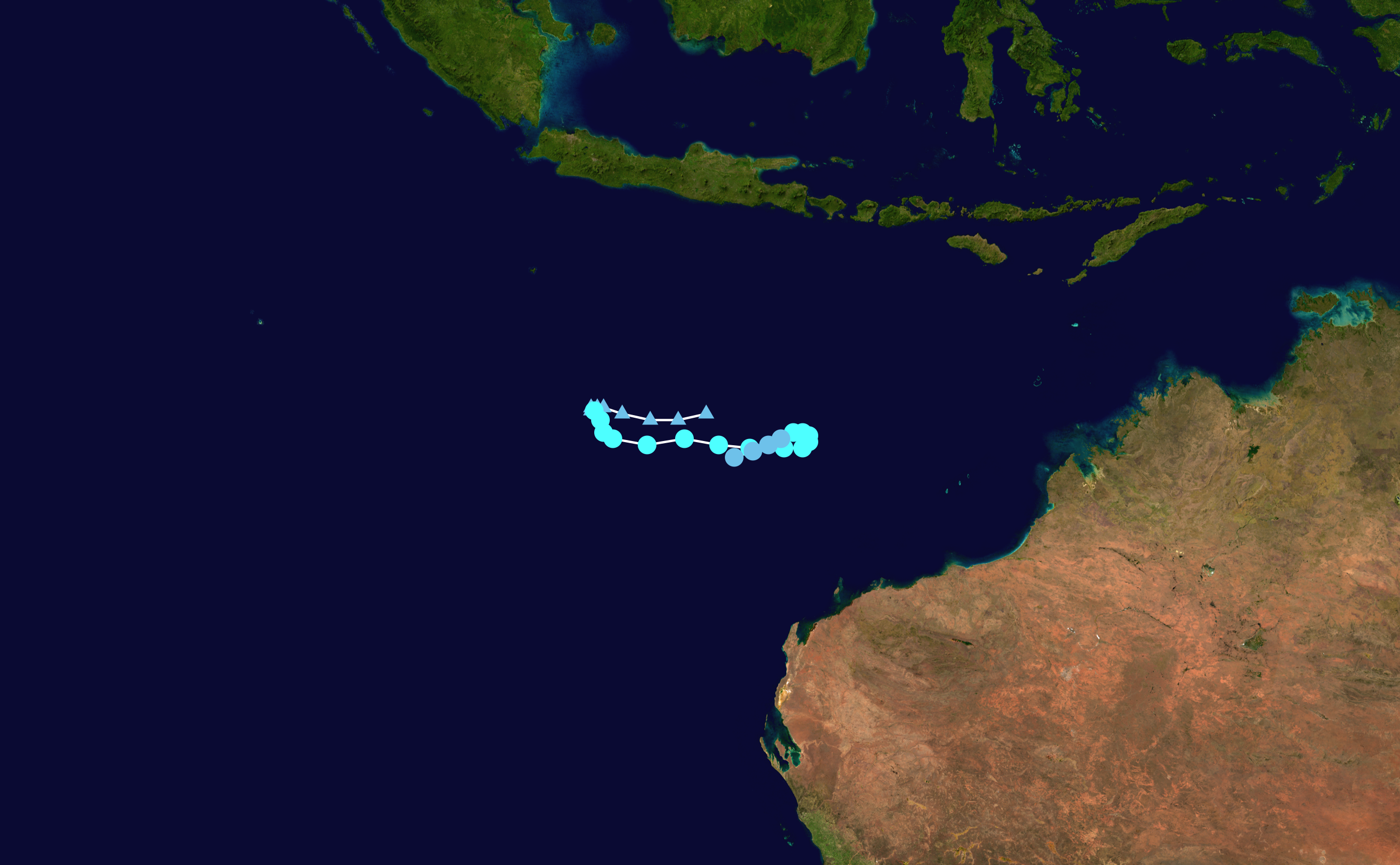
- Duration: 10 January – 15 January
- Peak intensity: 75 km/h (45 mph) (10-min); 986 hPa (mbar)

At midnight on 10 January, the Bureau of Meteorology (BoM) reported that a Tropical Low had developed off the coast of Western Australia. The system gradually intensified and became a Category 1 tropical cyclone on 12 January, receiving the name "Vince". The cyclone was initially expected to reach Category 2 status, but it became less well organised and lost cyclone intensity on 14 January.

=== Severe Tropical Cyclone Zelia ===
- Category 4 severe tropical cyclone (Australian scale)
- Category 2 tropical cyclone (SSHWS)
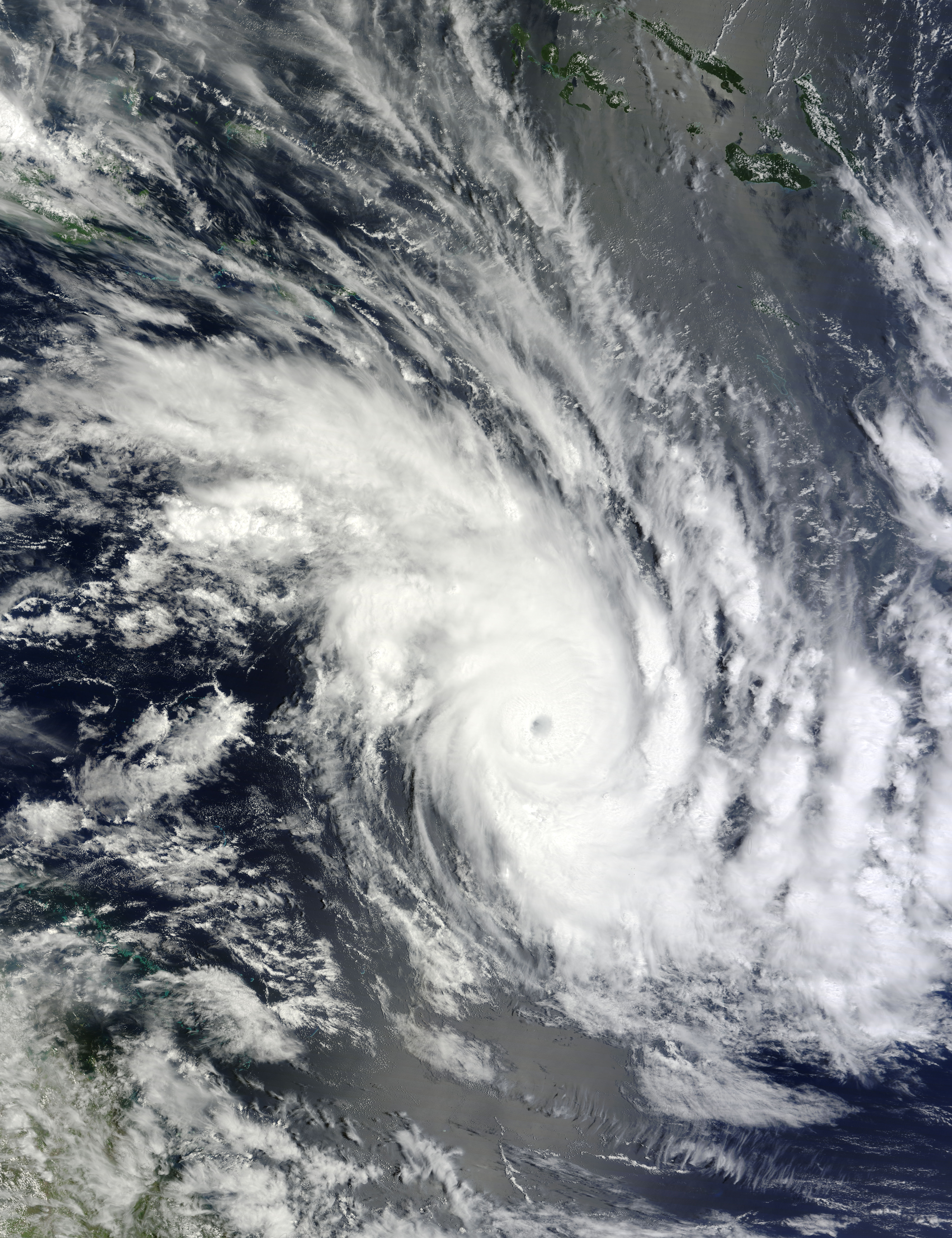
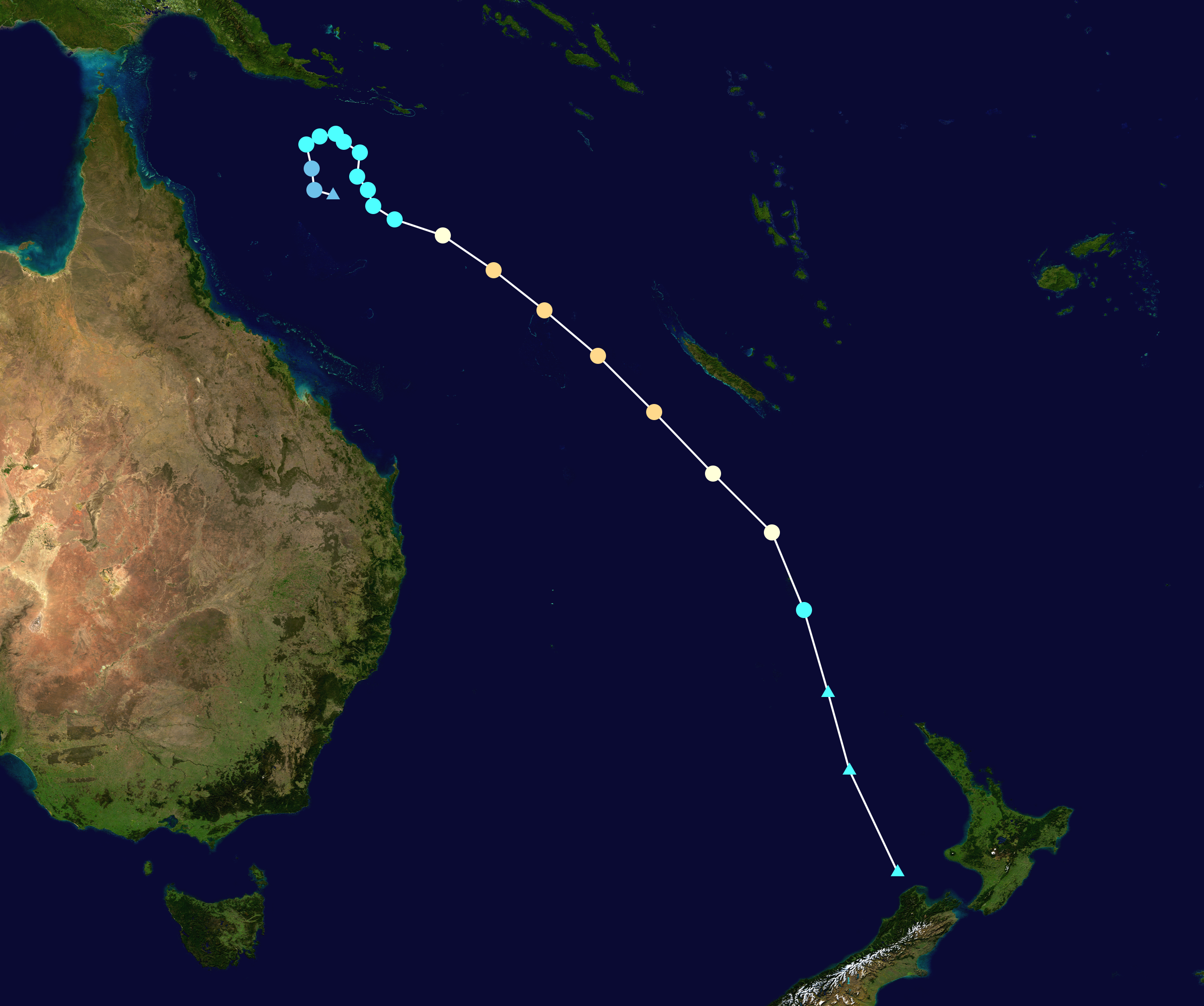
- Duration: 12 January – 16 January (Exited basin)
- Peak intensity: 185 km/h (115 mph) (10-min); 943 hPa (mbar)

On 12 January, TCWC Brisbane started monitoring Tropical Low 10U that had developed, over the Coral Sea to the northeast of Townsville in Queensland, Australia. Over the next day the system became the subject of a tropical cyclone formation alert as it moved north-westwards as the low level circulation centre consolidated and intensified.

The depression intensified into a Tropical Cyclone on 14 January, and given the named Zelia. It strengthened rapidly and became the first severe tropical cyclone of the season on 15 January. On 16 January, wind shear increased and cooler sea surface temperatures caused Zelia to weaken, as the system transitioned into a mid-latitude low as it passed east of Norfolk Island.

=== Tropical Cyclone Anthony ===
- Category 2 tropical cyclone (Australian scale)
- Tropical storm (SSHWS)
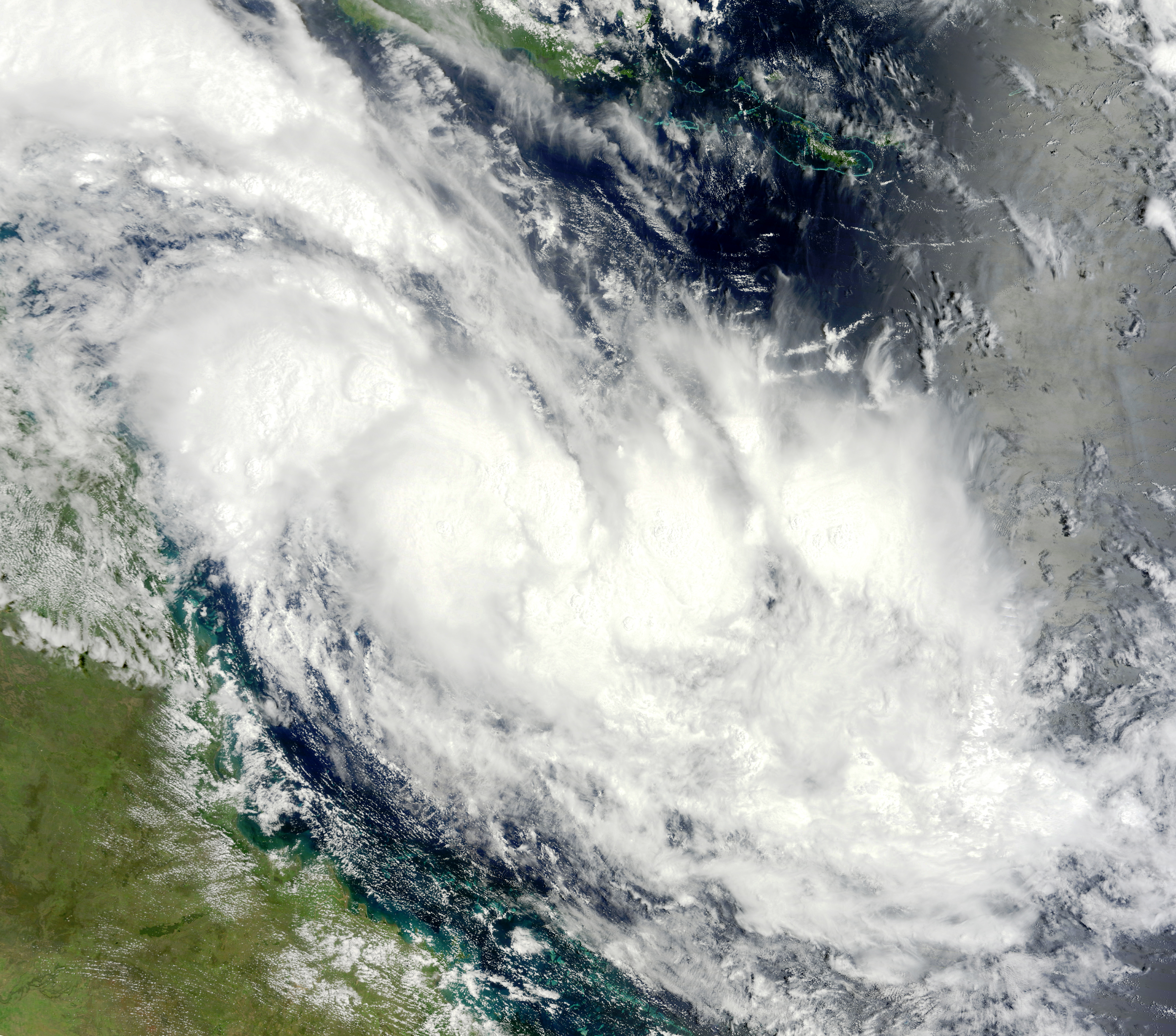
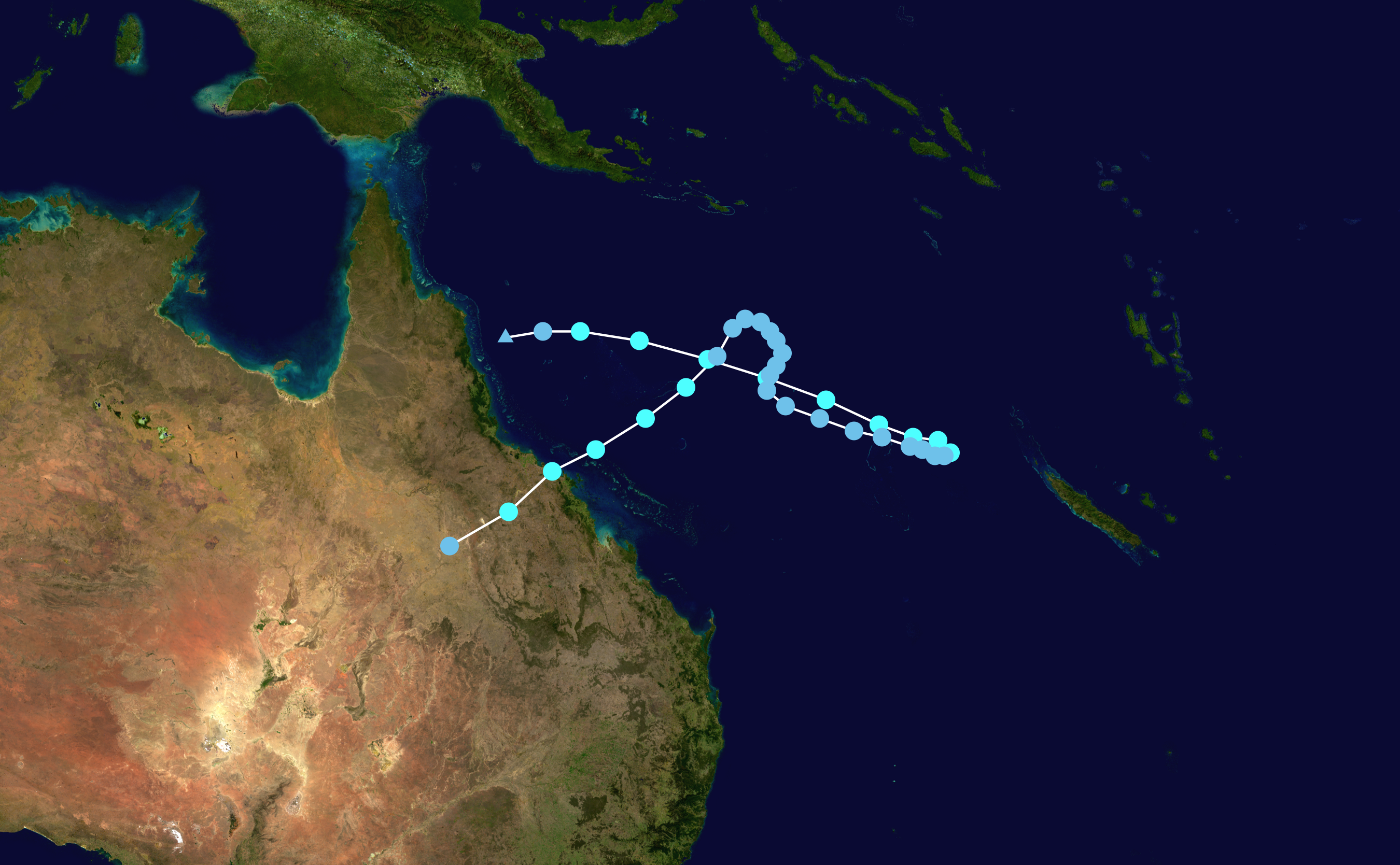
- Duration: 22 January – 31 January (Exited basin)
- Peak intensity: 95 km/h (60 mph) (10-min); 989 hPa (mbar)

During 22 January TCWC Brisbane reported that Tropical Low 11U had developed within the northwestern Coral Sea to the northeast of Cairns, Australia. Over the next day atmospheric convection developed and organised over the systems low level circulation, as it moved southeastwards away from the Queensland Coast under the influence of an upper-level trough of low pressure. The JTWC subsequently initiated advisories on the system early on 23 January and designated it as Tropical Cyclone 09P, before TCWC Brisbane reported that the system had developed into a category 1 tropical cyclone and named it Anthony. During that day the system may have become a category 2 tropical cyclone as radar and microwave imagery showed that Anthony had a well defined circulation and was forming a partial eyewall. The system subsequently moved into an area of higher vertical windshear and weakened into a tropical low during 24 January as it moved into the South Pacific basin.

The system moved back into the Australian region during 25 January but remained a tropical low over the next few days, as it moved north-westwards across the Coral Sea as a low level circulation centre with little or no associated convection. During 28 January TCWC Brisbane briefly reported that Anthony had re-intensified into a category 1 tropical cyclone, after wind shear over the system reduced due to a possible Fujiwhara interaction with a secondary circulation to the east of Anthony and Severe Tropical Cyclone Wilma. However, later that day the system turned and started moving towards the north-west as the secondary system moved to its north, which meant that Anthony became sheared again and weakened into a tropical low. The system remained a sheared tropical low until late on 29 January, when convection began to increase and organize as a result of weakening upper atmospheric wind shear. During the next day as Anthony moved towards the southwest and the Queensland coast, the JTWC re-initiated advisories on the system, before reporting that it had peaked with 1-minute sustained wind speeds of 100 km/h (60 mph). TCWC Brisbane also reported that the system had re-intensified into a category 1 tropical cyclone during that day, before reporting that it had become a category 2 tropical cyclone with peak 10-minute sustained wind speeds of 100 km/h (60 mph). The system subsequently made landfall on the Queensland east coast near Bowen and rapidly weakened over land.

Ahead of Anthony's landfall on the Queensland east coast, tropical cyclone watches and warnings were issued for the region between Innisfail, St Lawrence and Charters Towers. Townsville and Mackay were pre-emptively declared disaster areas to aid the recovery response, while the ports of Townsville, Mackay, Hay Point and Abbott Point were closed.

=== Severe Tropical Cyclone Bianca ===
- Category 4 severe tropical cyclone (Australian scale)
- Category 2 tropical cyclone (SSHWS)
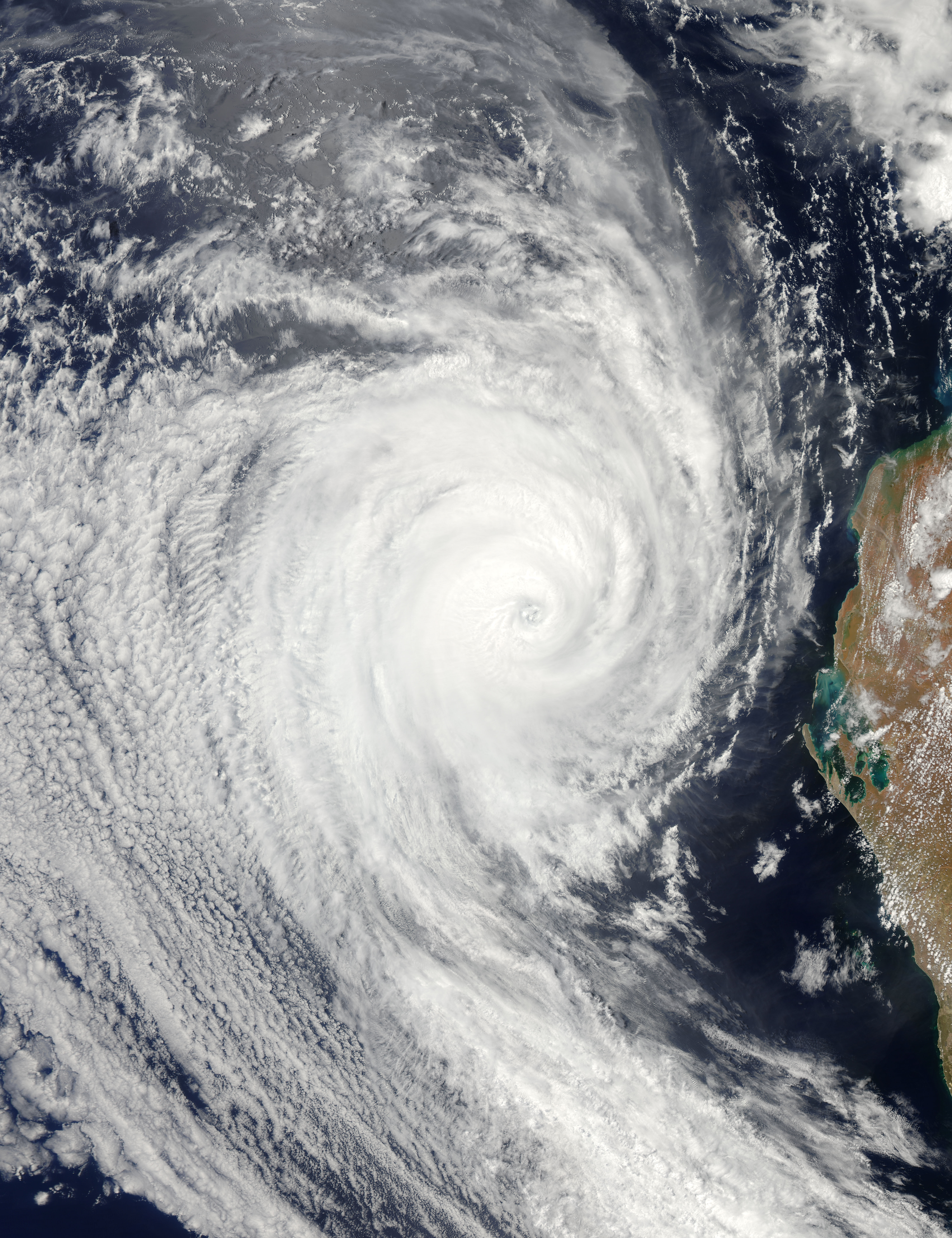
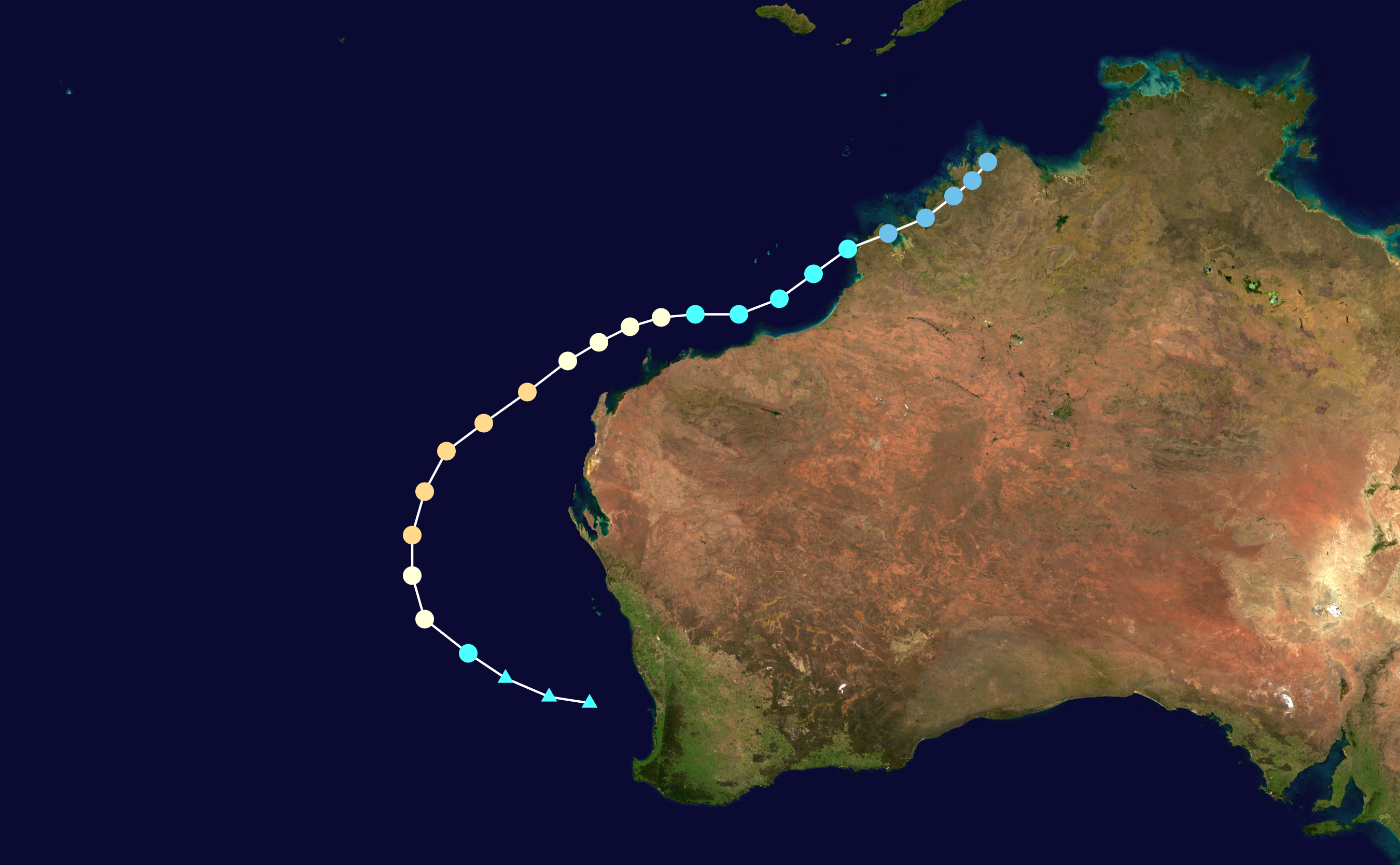
- Duration: 23 January – 30 January
- Peak intensity: 175 km/h (110 mph) (10-min); 949 hPa (mbar)

Early on 21 January TCWC Darwin reported that Tropical Low 12U had developed within the Gulf of Carpentaria. Gradual strengthening took place and on 25 January, the Joint Typhoon Warning Center (JTWC) began monitoring the system as Tropical Cyclone 10P. A few hours later, TCWC Perth upgraded the low into a Category 1 Tropical Cyclone, naming it Bianca. Early on the next day, TCWC Perth further upgraded Bianca to a Category 2 Tropical Cyclone. Intensification continued and late on the same day, TCWC Perth upgraded Bianca into a Category 3 Severe Tropical Cyclone. The system continued to intensify and became a Category 4 severe tropical cyclone on 28 January. On the same day, the system started weakening rapidly and TCWC Perth downgraded Bianca into a Category 3 Severe Tropical Cyclone.

Rain and strong winds were experienced along the Kimberley coast on 25 January. On 26 January, Bianca moved away from Kimberley and weather conditions started to improve. Bianca disrupted operations in Australia's major iron ore port and several oil facilities. In Western Australia, preparations were underway as the system was soon expected to approach land. As soon as Bianca became a category 3 Severe tropical cyclone, strong winds lashed through Pilbara suspending oil and gas production and port facilities. Though Bianca was moving away and the level of risk was going down, coastal communities between Onslow and Exmouth remained on a red alert as the system intensified. On 28 January, according to the media, there was a chance for Bianca to start weakening, as it was moving further south into a colder, high pressure zone.

The last cyclone to track south of Perth was Cyclone Ned in 1989.

Severe Tropical Cyclone Bianca was expected to make landfall around Mandurah as a weak Category 1 or strong Tropical Low late on 30 January. A Cyclone Warning was issued for the area between just north of Jurien Bay and Albany, including Perth. However, the warnings were cancelled on 30 January as Bianca dissipated south of Western Australia in the afternoon of 30 January. The airmass around Bianca was responsible for giving Perth and the Southwest of WA a taste of the tropics with severe thunderstorms, unrelated to Bianca, springing up on 29 January causing damage in the Geraldton region. Two deaths were attributed to damaging severe thunderstorms that formed along the storm's outer rainbands.

=== Severe Tropical Cyclone Yasi ===
- Category 5 severe tropical cyclone (Australian scale)
- Category 4 tropical cyclone (SSHWS)
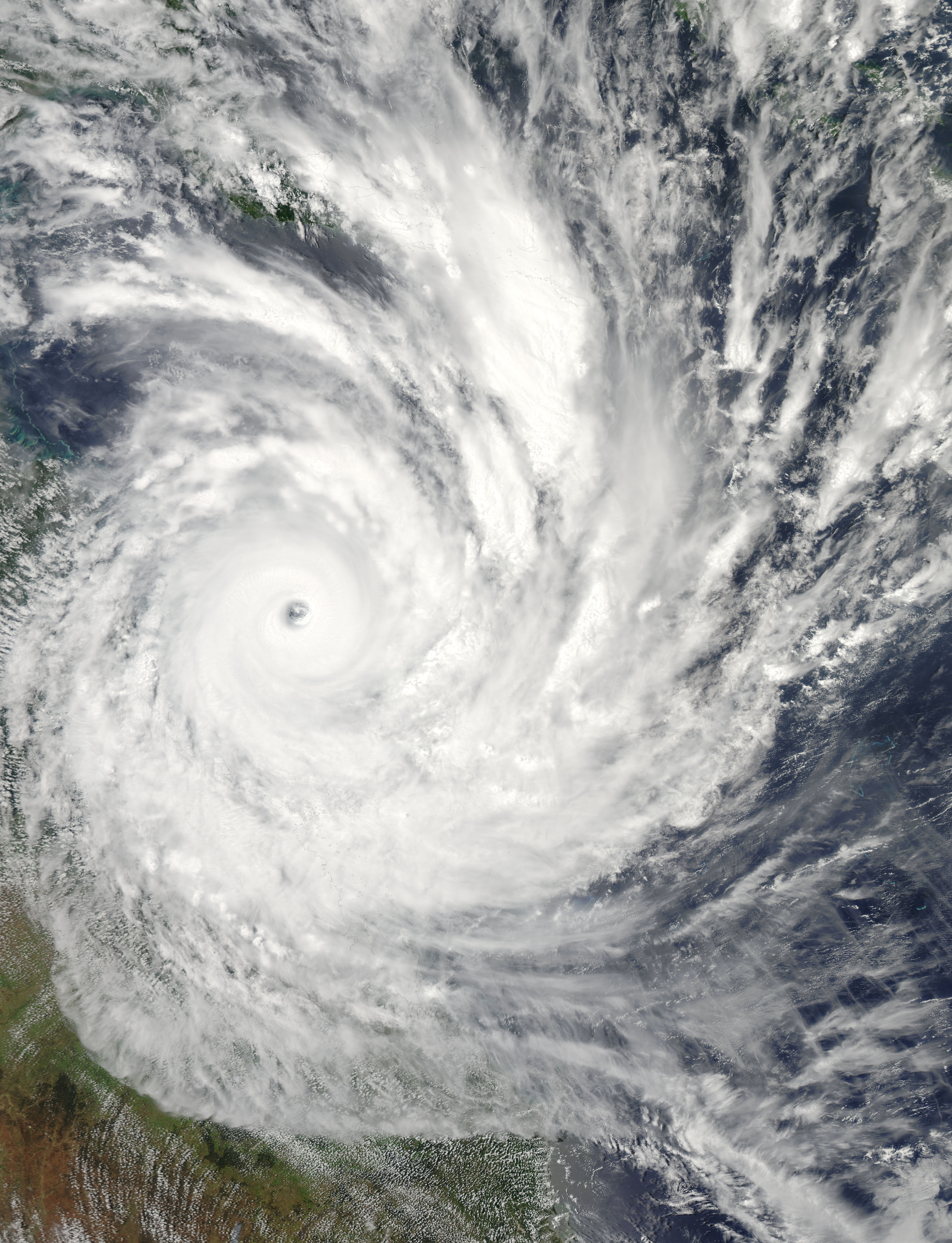
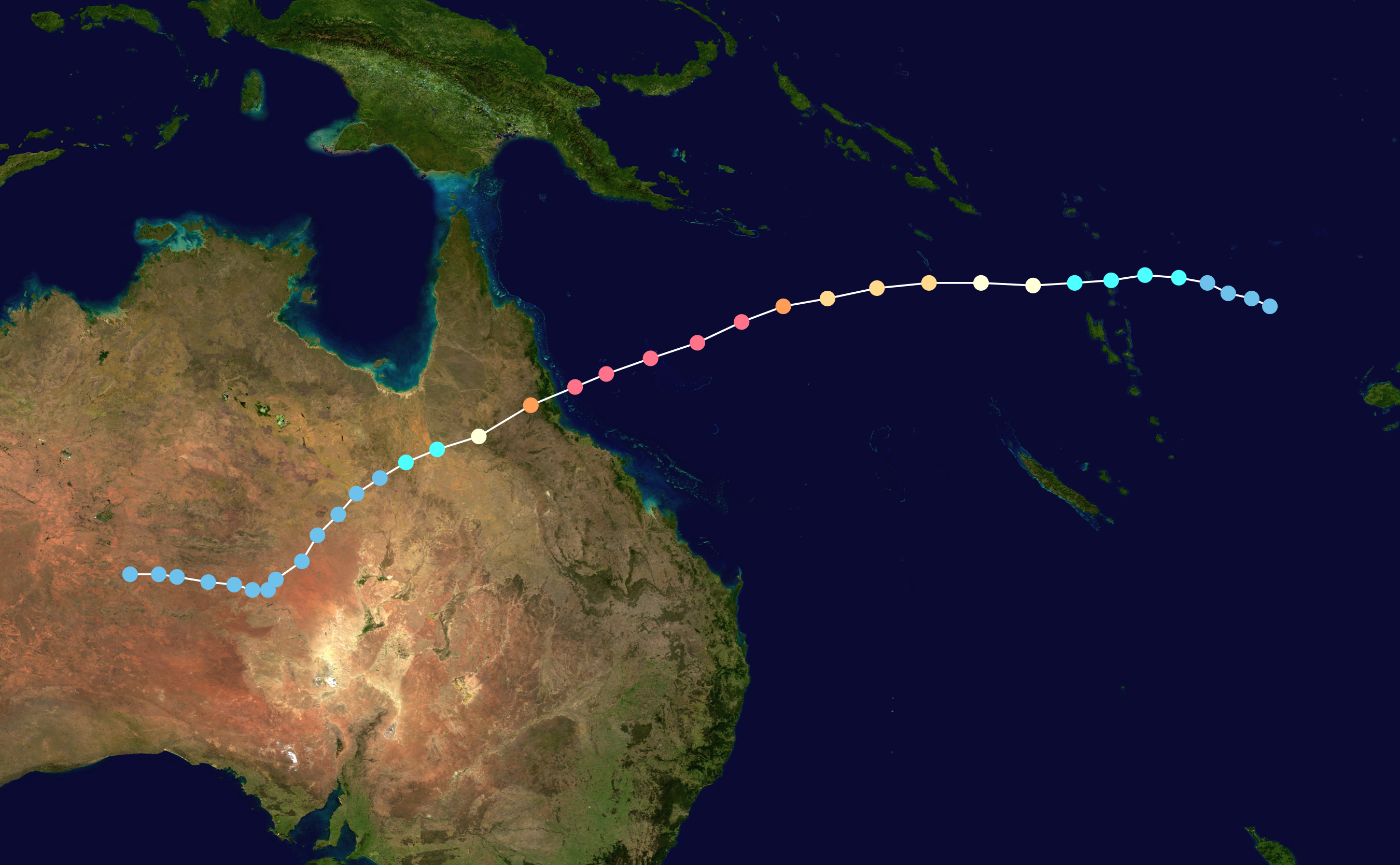
- Duration: 31 January (Entered basin) – 3 February
- Peak intensity: 205 km/h (125 mph) (10-min); 929 hPa (mbar)

Yasi entered the Australian region from the South Pacific basin on 31 January. By the time Yasi crossed into the basin, preparations for the storm were under way. Media outlets referred to the storm as "what could be the state's worst cyclone in history." Many feared that the tropical cyclone could cause damage more severe than Cyclone Larry in 2006 and Cyclone Tracy, which nearly destroyed Darwin, in 1974. Thousands of residents in the path of the storm were urged to evacuate by Premier Anna Bligh.

Yasi crossed the Queensland coast near Mission Beach shortly after midnight (local time) on 3 February. At that time, the large destructive core around the eye extended between Innisfail and Cardwell, Queensland. Yasi caused at least $3.6 billion (2011 USD) in damage, becoming the costliest tropical cyclone recorded in the Australian region. Accounting for inflation, Yasi was the second-costliest tropical cyclone in Australia's history, after Cyclone Tracy. One death occurred due to asphyxiation in Ingham.

=== Tropical Low 15U (14S) ===
- Tropical low (Australian scale)
- Tropical storm (SSHWS)
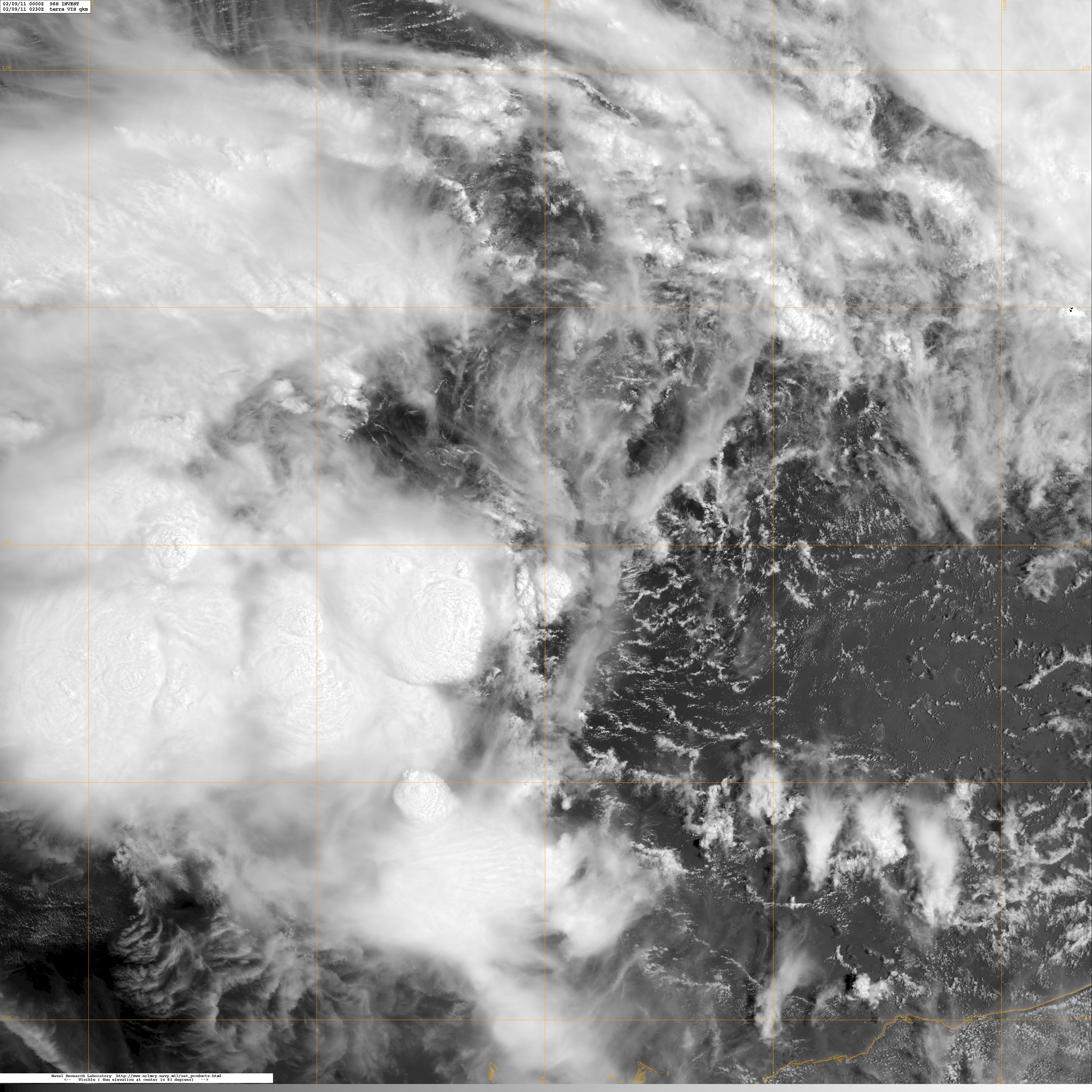
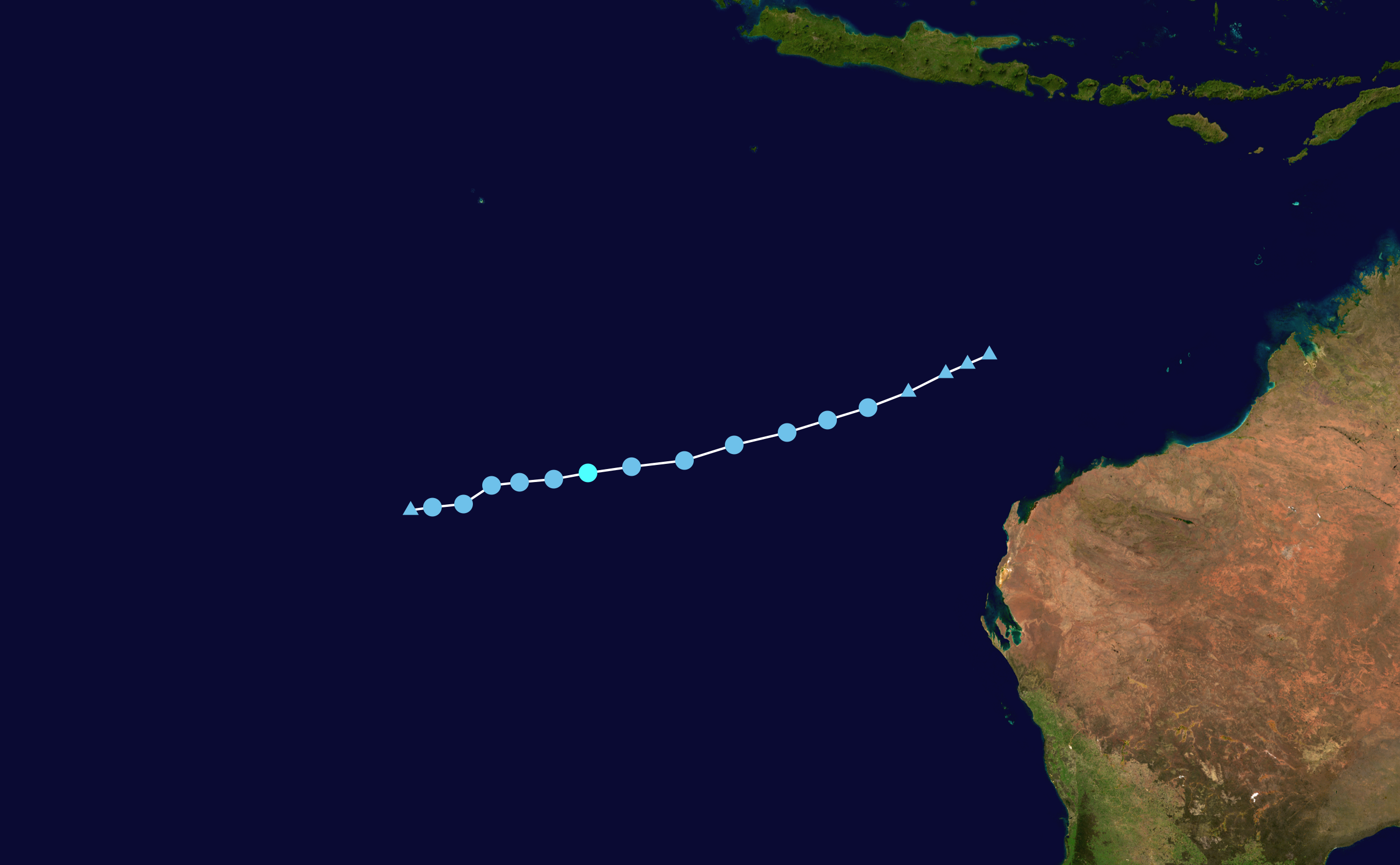
- Duration: 8 February – 13 February
- Peak intensity: 55 km/h (35 mph) (10-min); 996 hPa (mbar)

A low formed off the Western Australian coast on 8 February and drifted steadily west south west for the next few days. On 11 February, the Bureau of Meteorology identified the system as Tropical Low 15U and began monitoring the system for further development. Later that day, the JTWC began issuing advisories on the system under the name Tropical Cyclone 14S. The storm was expected to reach minimal category 1 cyclone intensity (Australian scale) on 12 February but high shear, cool sea temperatures and poor organisation saw the system stay as a low.

=== Severe Tropical Cyclone Dianne ===
- Category 3 severe tropical cyclone (Australian scale)
- Category 1 tropical cyclone (SSHWS)
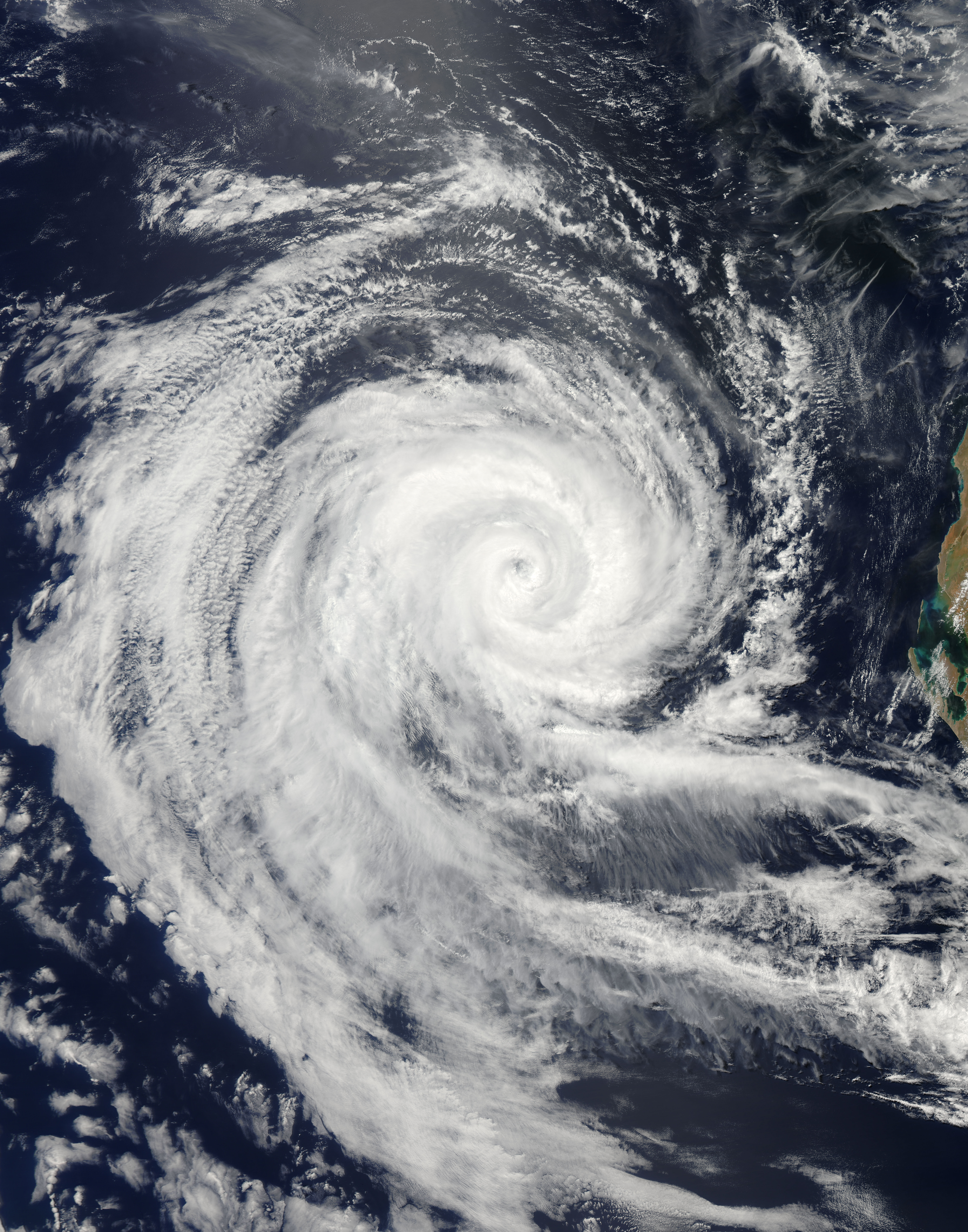
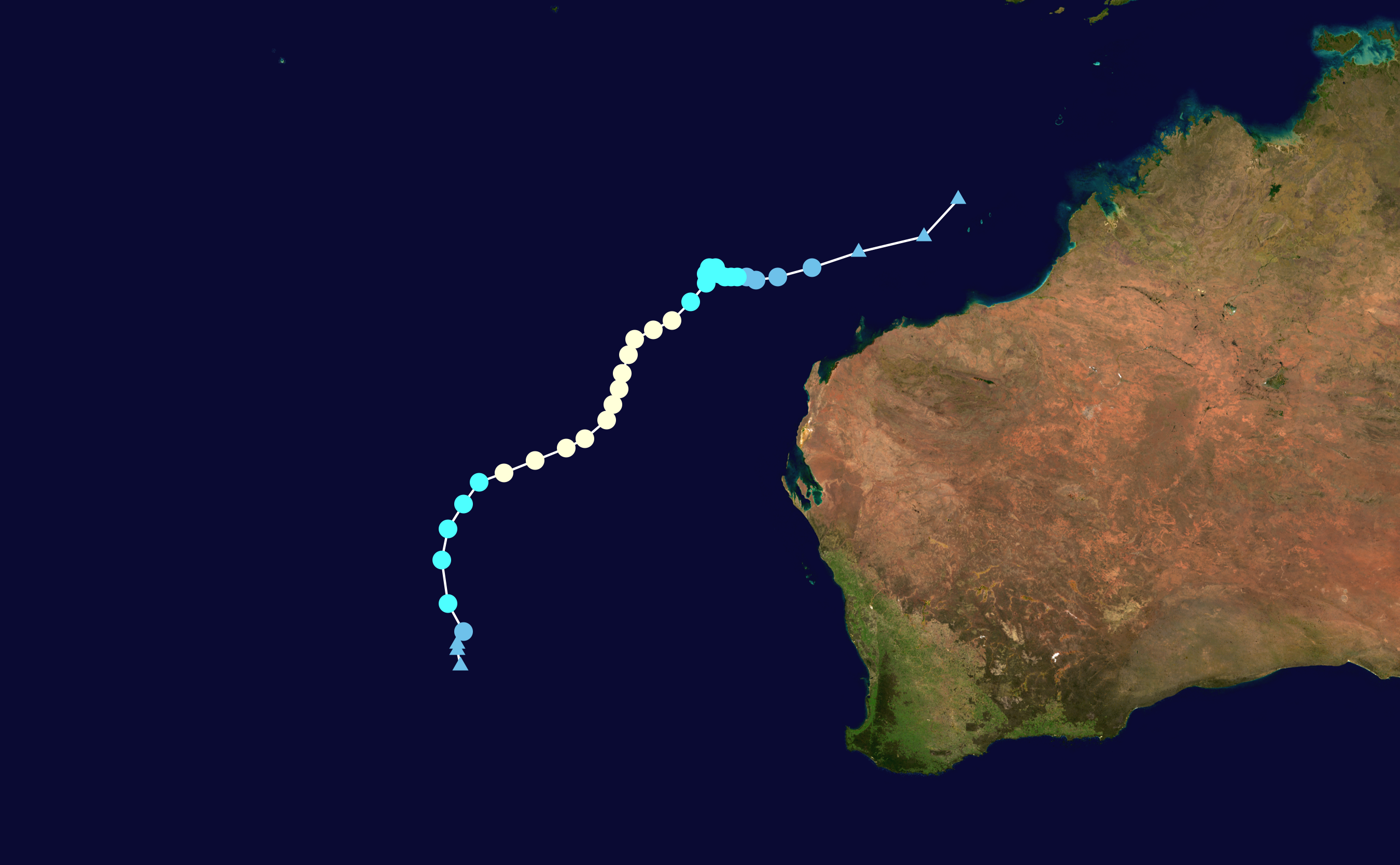
- Duration: 14 February – 22 February
- Peak intensity: 140 km/h (85 mph) (10-min); 960 hPa (mbar)

Tropical Low 16U developed within a monsoon trough during 14 February, about 405 km (250 mi) to the north of Port Hedland in Western Australia. Over the next few days, the system remained well offshore and was steered drifted towards the west-southwest by a ridge of high pressure while slowly developing further.

A Cyclone watch was issued for the coastal communities between Onslow to Coral Bay. Late on 16 February, the low formed into Tropical Cyclone Dianne whilst 445 km NW of Exmouth. Dianne intensified as expected and was upgraded to a Category 2 cyclone on 18 February whilst slowly moving towards the SSW. On 19 February the system intensified into a Category 3 severe tropical cyclone. By late 21 February the system lost its strength as it moved into colder waters and was downgraded to a Category 1 Tropical Cyclone, and by 22 February it was classified as an ex-Tropical low.

=== Severe Tropical Cyclone Carlos ===
- Category 3 severe tropical cyclone (Australian scale)
- Category 1 tropical cyclone (SSHWS)
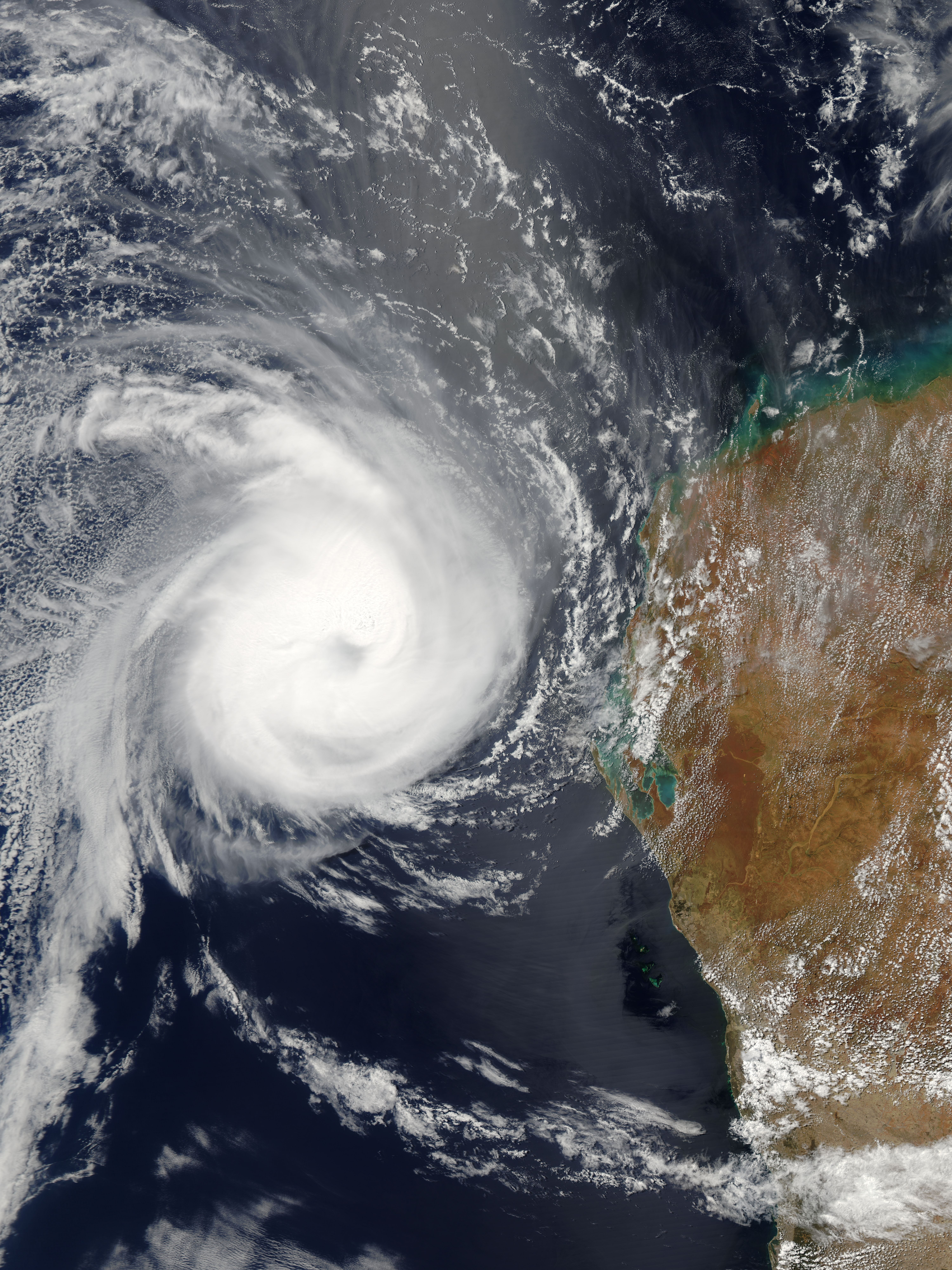
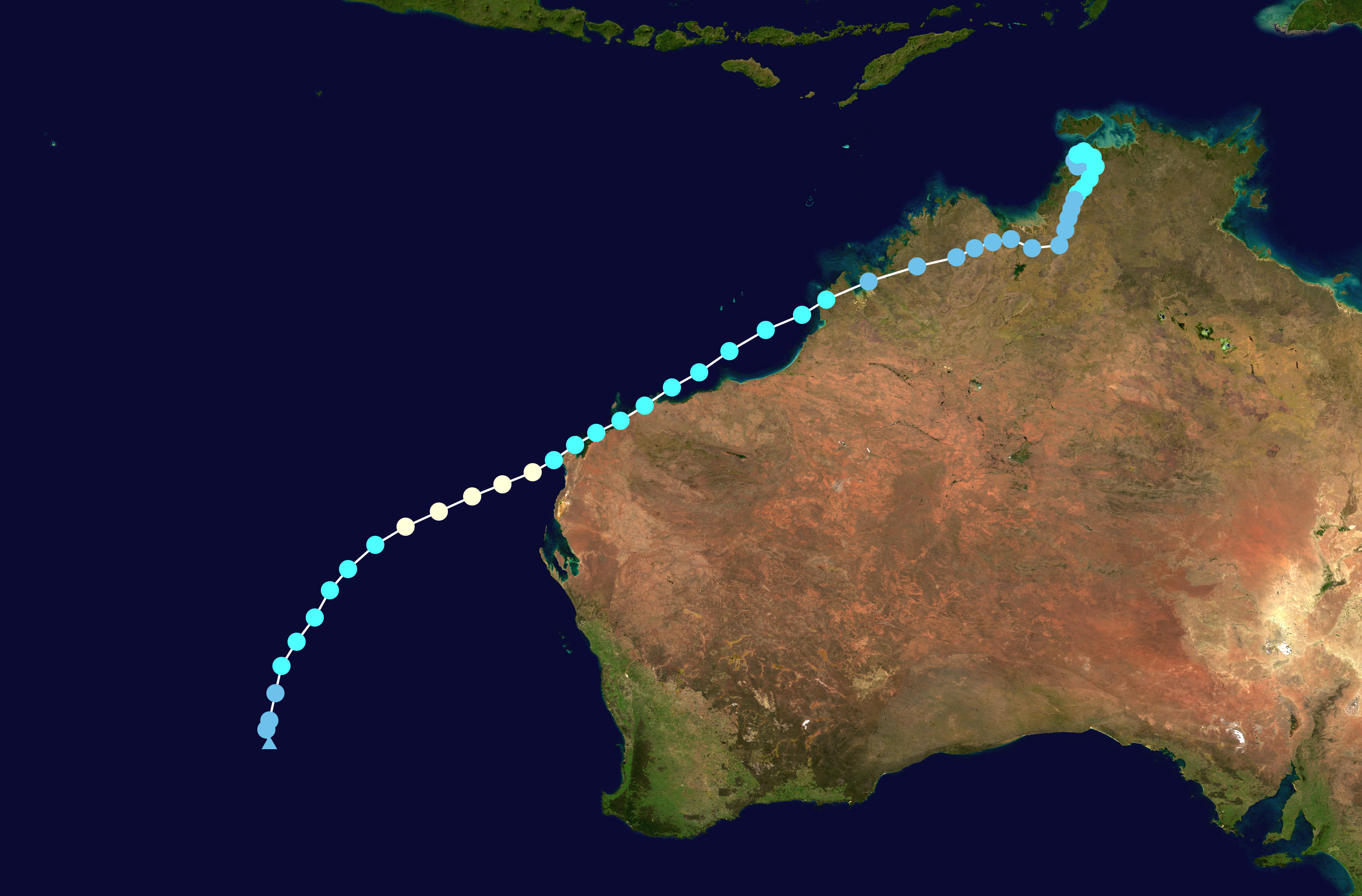
- Duration: 14 February – 27 February
- Peak intensity: 120 km/h (75 mph) (10-min); 969 hPa (mbar)

On 14 February the Tropical Cyclone Warning Centre (TCWC) in Darwin reported that a tropical low formed near latitude 13.2S, longitude 130.7E, about 40 km (25 miles) west southwest of Batchelor. A severe weather warning was issued for northwest Darwin-Daly District and the Tiwi Islands. Heavy rain pounded the area on 15 February with reports of Marrara recording 179.4 mm (7.06 in) and Darwin International Airport 131.0 mm (5.16 in) of rain. This was later followed by 339.6 mm (13.37 in) of rain in just 24 hours, which is the highest 24-hour rainfall for the city on record.

On 16 February the slow moving system strengthened into Tropical Cyclone Carlos causing localised flooding and damage to homes, with fallen trees. Schools in Darwin, Darwin International Airport and East Arm Wharf were closed. After looping around the Darwin area overnight and back over land the system weakened on 17 February and BOM downgraded it to a Tropical low. A record three-day total of 684.8 mm (26.96 in) rain was recorded at Darwin International Airport due to the lingering of the system.

The system moved slowly southwest on 18 February moving towards the Northern Territory/Western Australian border with a possibility of restrengthening. The community of Daly River received 442 mm (17.4 in) of rainfall. On 19 February the system passed into the Northern Kimberley region. Rainfall totals were not as large as in previous days. Wyndham recorded 90 mm (3.5 in) while Kalumburu recorded 80 mm (3.1 in) of rainfall.

In the early hours of 21 February the system returned to the open waters of the Indian Ocean, causing it to redevelop back into a cyclone. The system was located 75 km (47 mi) northwest of Broome. The cyclone continued to track southwest at a relatively fast pace and produced a squall line that generated four tornadoes in the mining town of Karratha which damaged 38 homes as well as numerous cars, buildings and a school. It also strengthened steadily to become a category 2 cyclone.

On 22 February the system moved parallel to the Pilbara coast. Varanus Island recorded 59 mm (2.3 in) of rainfall and the highest wind gust recorded in the area was 120 km/h (75 mph) at Bedout Island. The system became more organised and on 23 February the record rainfall amount of 283 mm (11.1 in) was recorded at Barrow Island. The strongest gusts of 139 km/h (86 mph) recorded at Varanus Island. The cyclone crossed the North West Cape and lashed Onslow and Exmouth with high winds up to 155 km/h (96 mph) and rain.

As Carlos moved away from the western coast of Australia on 24 February it strengthened into a Severe Tropical Cyclone. Carlos also spun-off a mini tornado to Ellenbrook, Perth, Western Australia on 28 February.

=== Tropical Low 18U ===
- Tropical low (Australian scale)
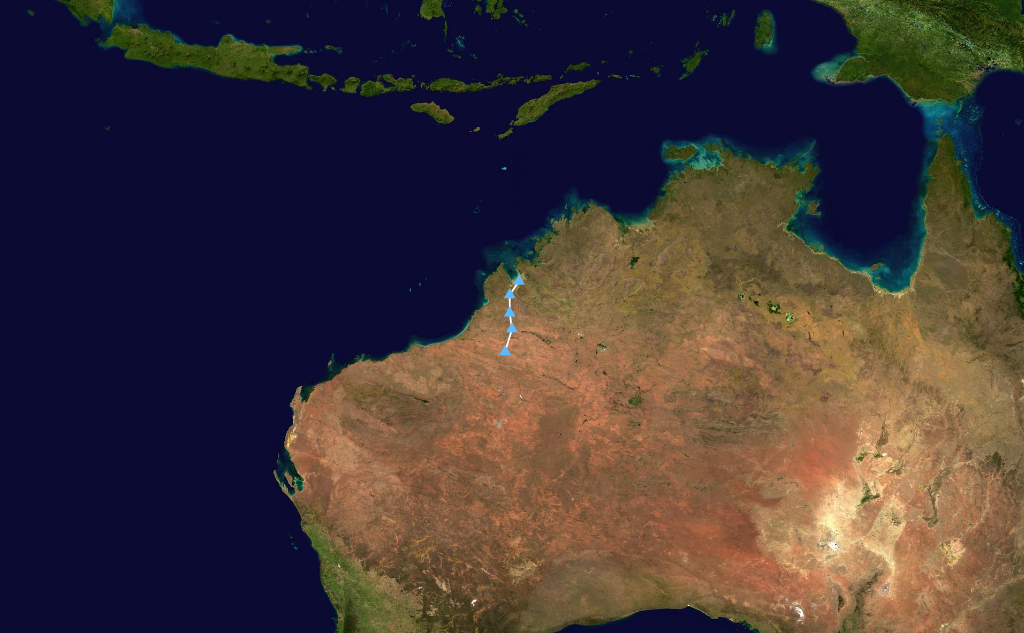
- Duration: 23 February – 28 February
- Peak intensity: 55 km/h (35 mph) (10-min); 992 hPa (mbar)

On 25 February, the Tropical Cyclone Warning Centre (TCWC) in Perth reported that a tropical low formed estimated to be 75 km (47 miles) west northwest of Kalumburu and 445 km (277 miles) northeast of Derby and moving slowly southwest parallel to the north Kimberly coast. In the early hours of 28 February the tropical low moved inland from King Sound. Heavy rainfall was reported on the Dampier Peninsula east and southeast of Port Hedland, including Telfer and parts of the De Grey catchment. Derby recorded 83 mm (3.3 in) of rain while Camballin received 142 mm (5.6 in) and the aboriginal community of Looma had 105 mm (4.1 in). The tropical low continued moving overland and the BOM issued their final advisory on 28 February.

=== Tropical Low 23U (Cherono) ===
- Tropical low (Australian scale)
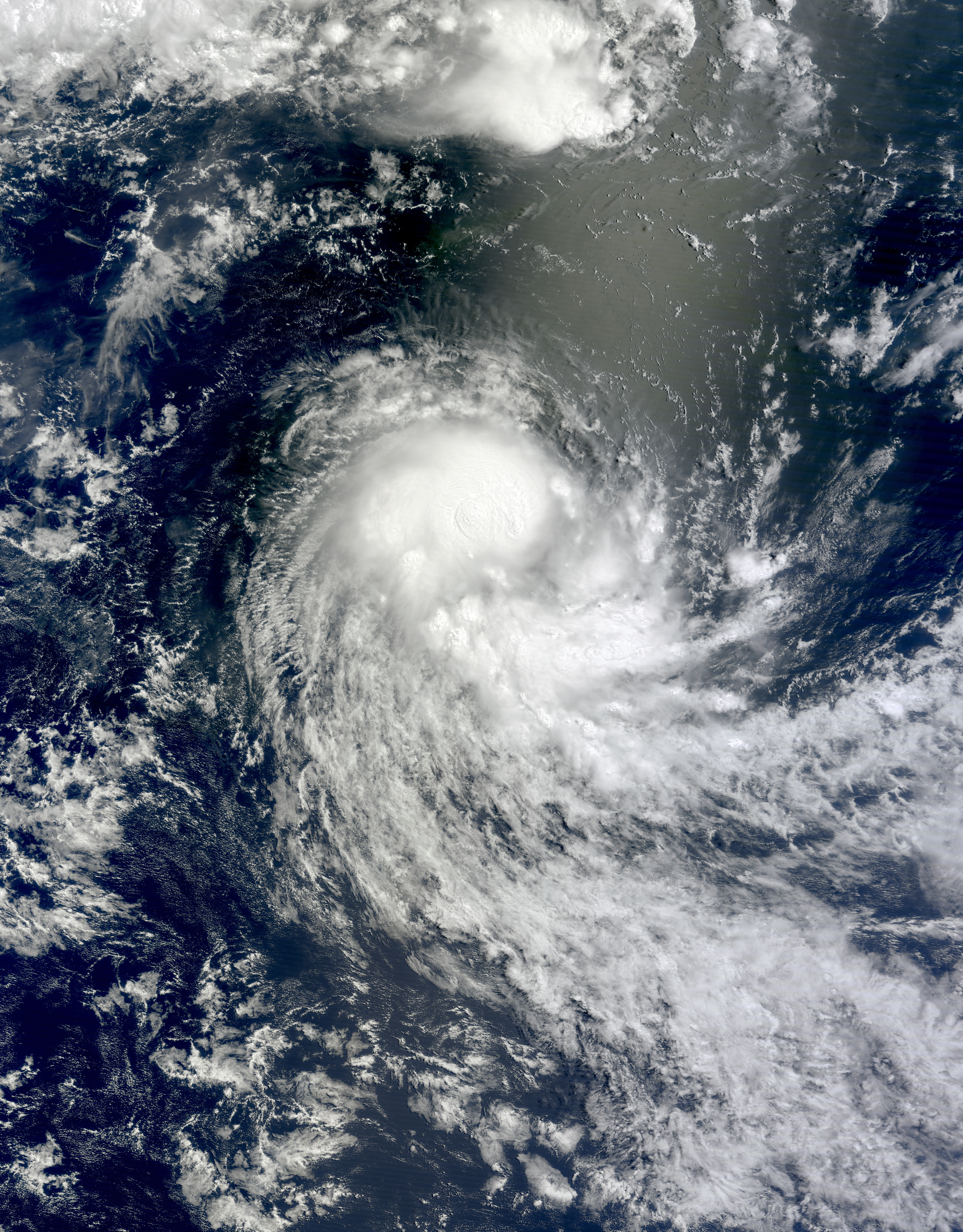
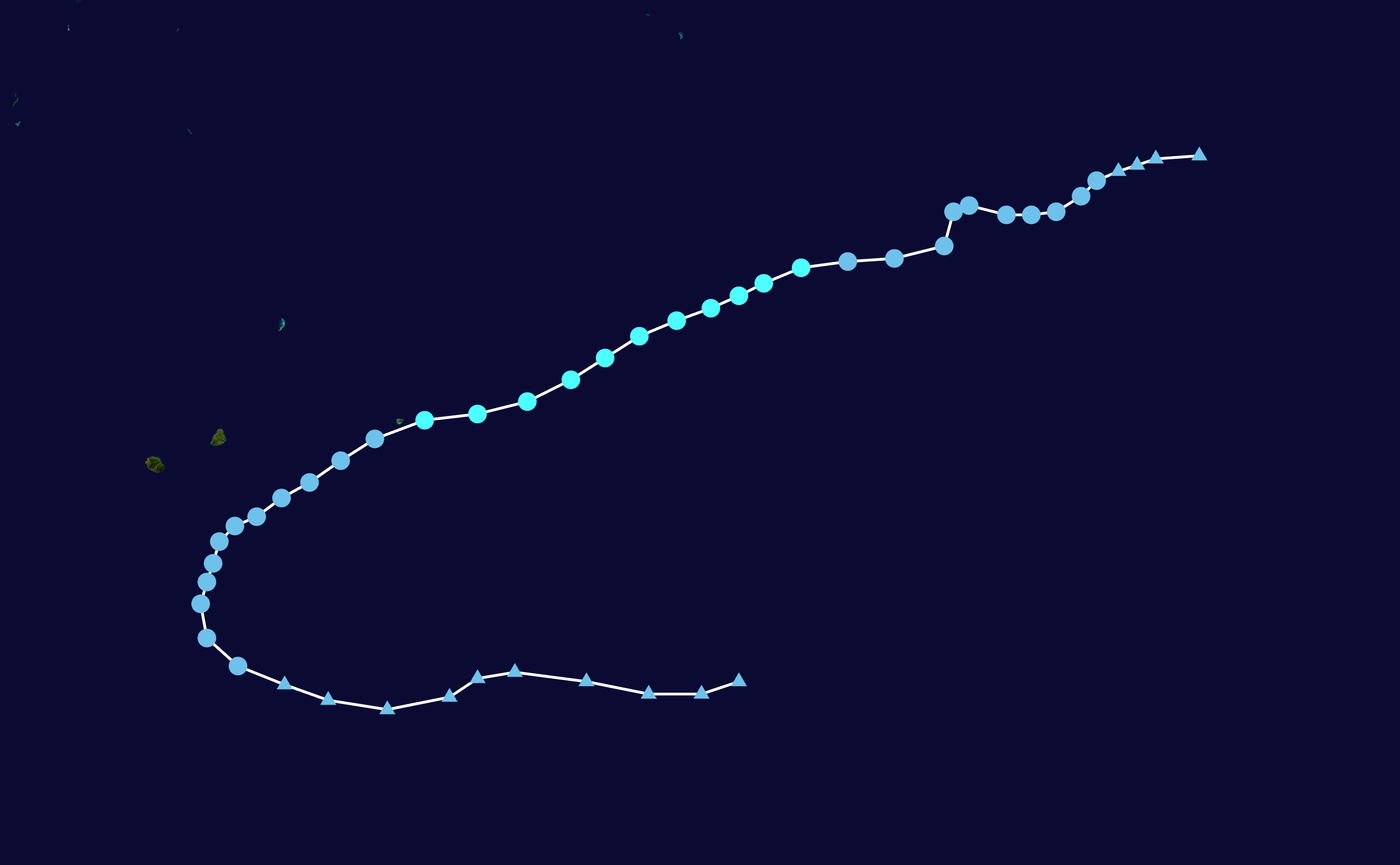
- Duration: 10 March – 14 March (Exited basin)
- Peak intensity: Winds not specified; 1006 hPa (mbar)

On 10 March TCWC Perth reported that Tropical Low 23U, had developed within TCWC Jakarta's area of responsibility about 1,640 km (1,020 mi) to the east of Jakarta, Indonesia. Over the next couple of days the low remained slow moving. On 13 March, the low briefly moved into TCWC Perth's area of responsibility, before crossing 90°E and moving out of the Australian region and into the South-West Indian Ocean. It later developed into Tropical Storm Cherono.

=== Tropical Cyclone 25U (20S) ===
- Category 1 tropical cyclone (Australian scale)
- Tropical storm (SSHWS)
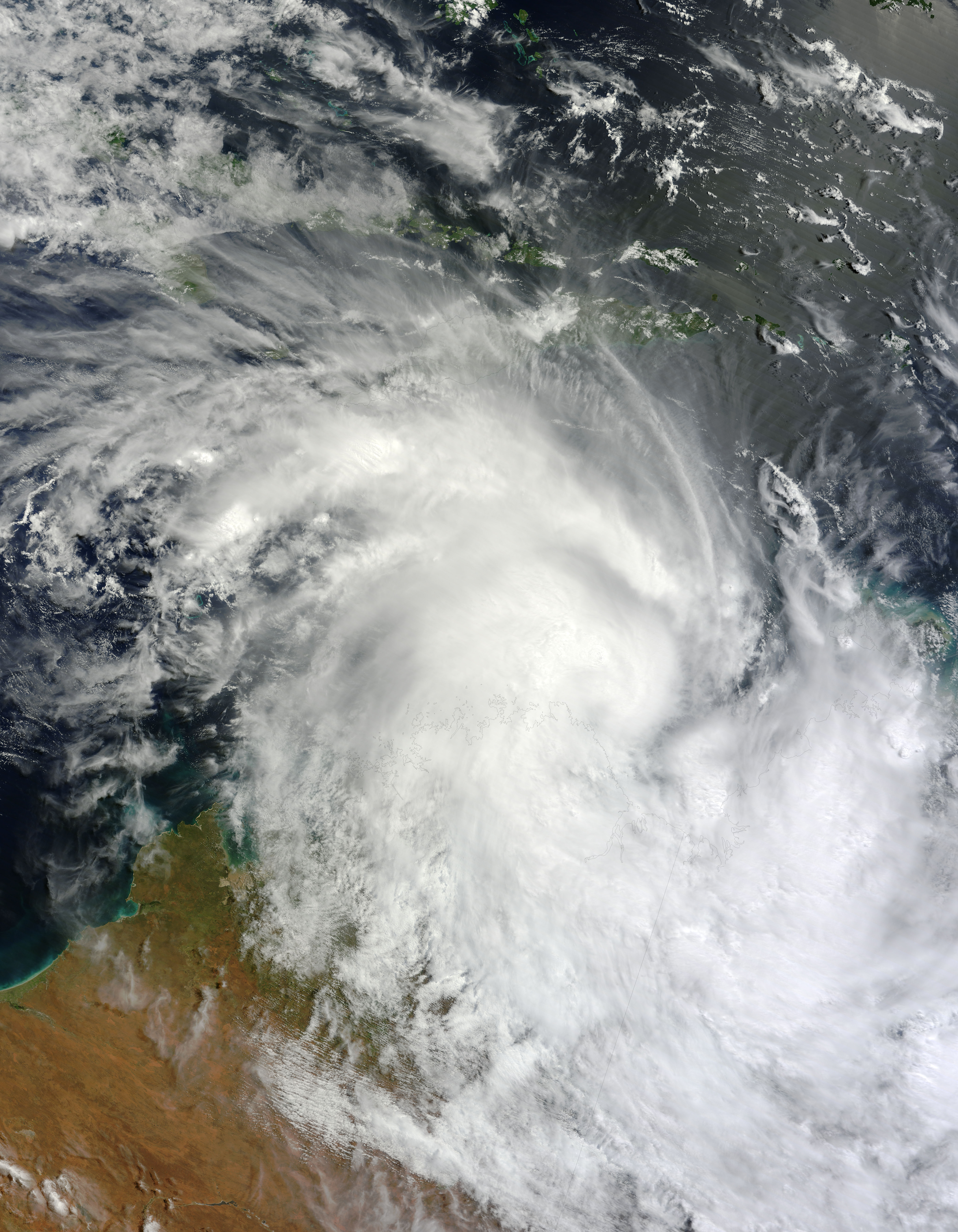
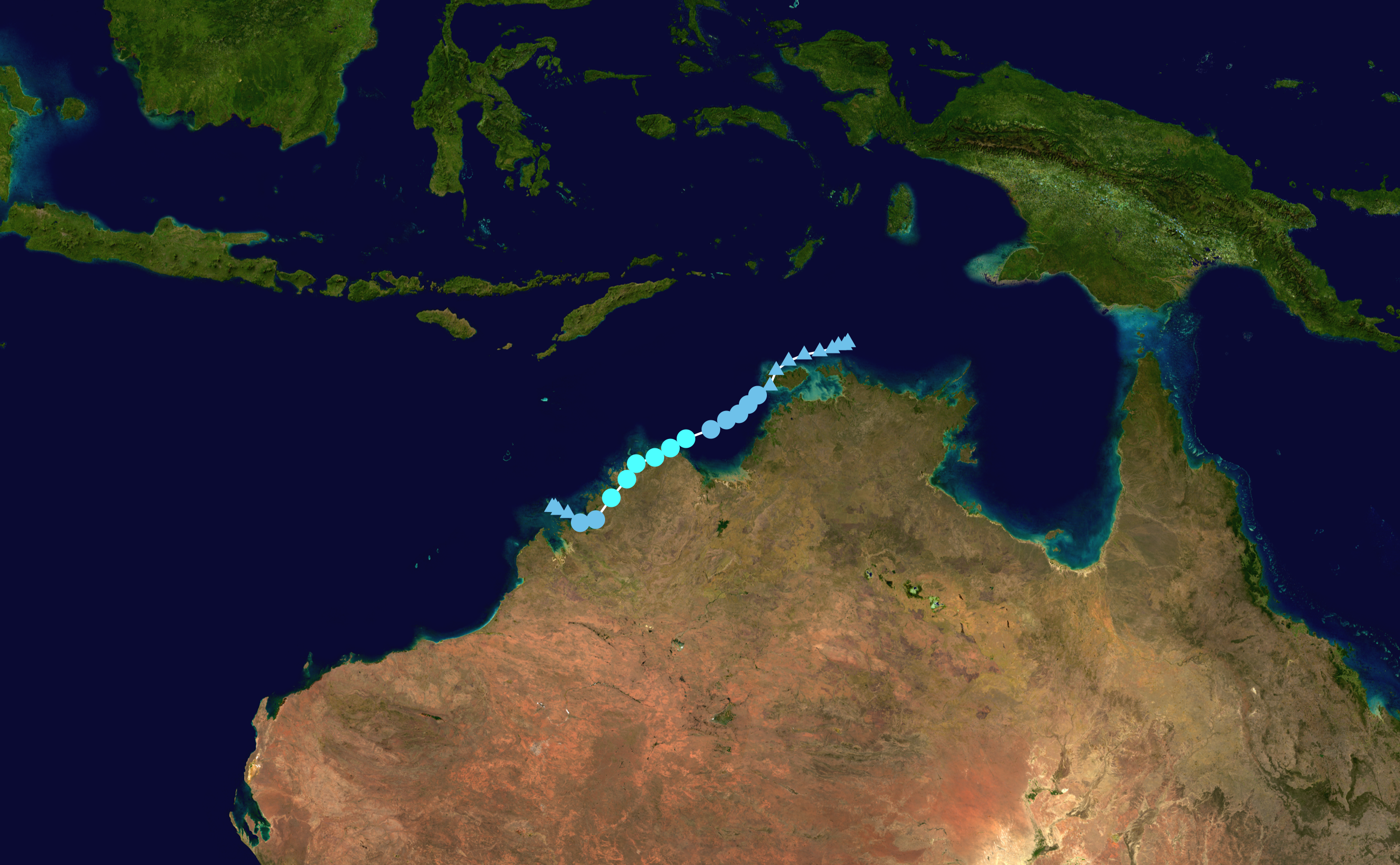
- Duration: 26 March – 6 April
- Peak intensity: 75 km/h (45 mph) (10-min); 994 hPa (mbar)

Towards the end of March, a tropical low developed within the monsoon trough, in the western Arafura Sea to the north of the Tiwi Islands. Over the next few days, the system moved south-westwards and passed over the Tiwi Islands during 31 March. Over the next few days the system slowly moved around the Arafura Sea, before TCWC Darwin initiated advisories on the low during 30 March as atmospheric convection surrounding the system organised further.

During February 2022, a reanalysis of the system showed that it had developed into a tropical cyclone during 2 April, before it made landfall on the northern Kimberley coast.

=== Severe Tropical Cyclone Errol ===
- Category 3 severe tropical cyclone (Australian scale)
- Tropical storm (SSHWS)
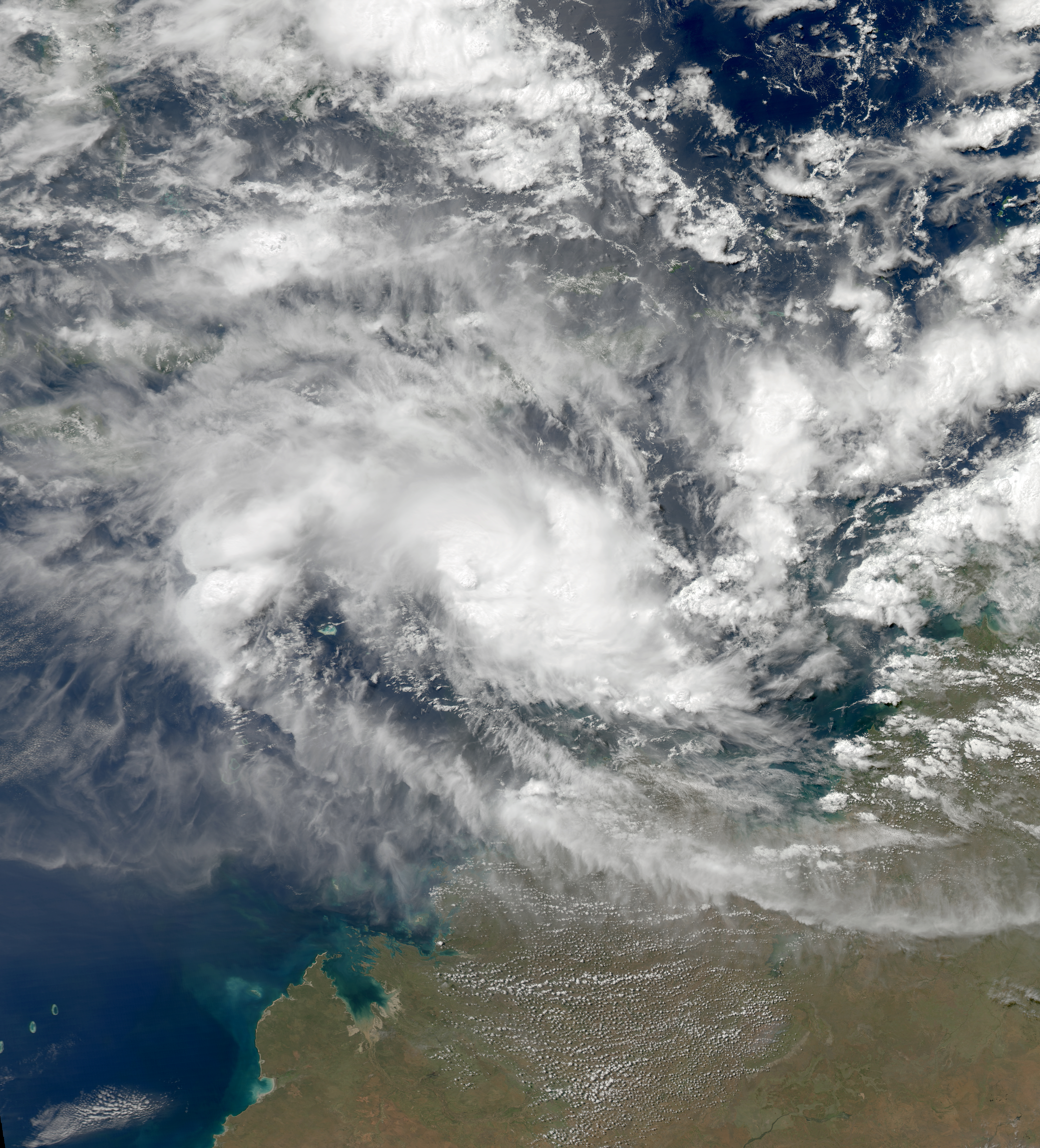
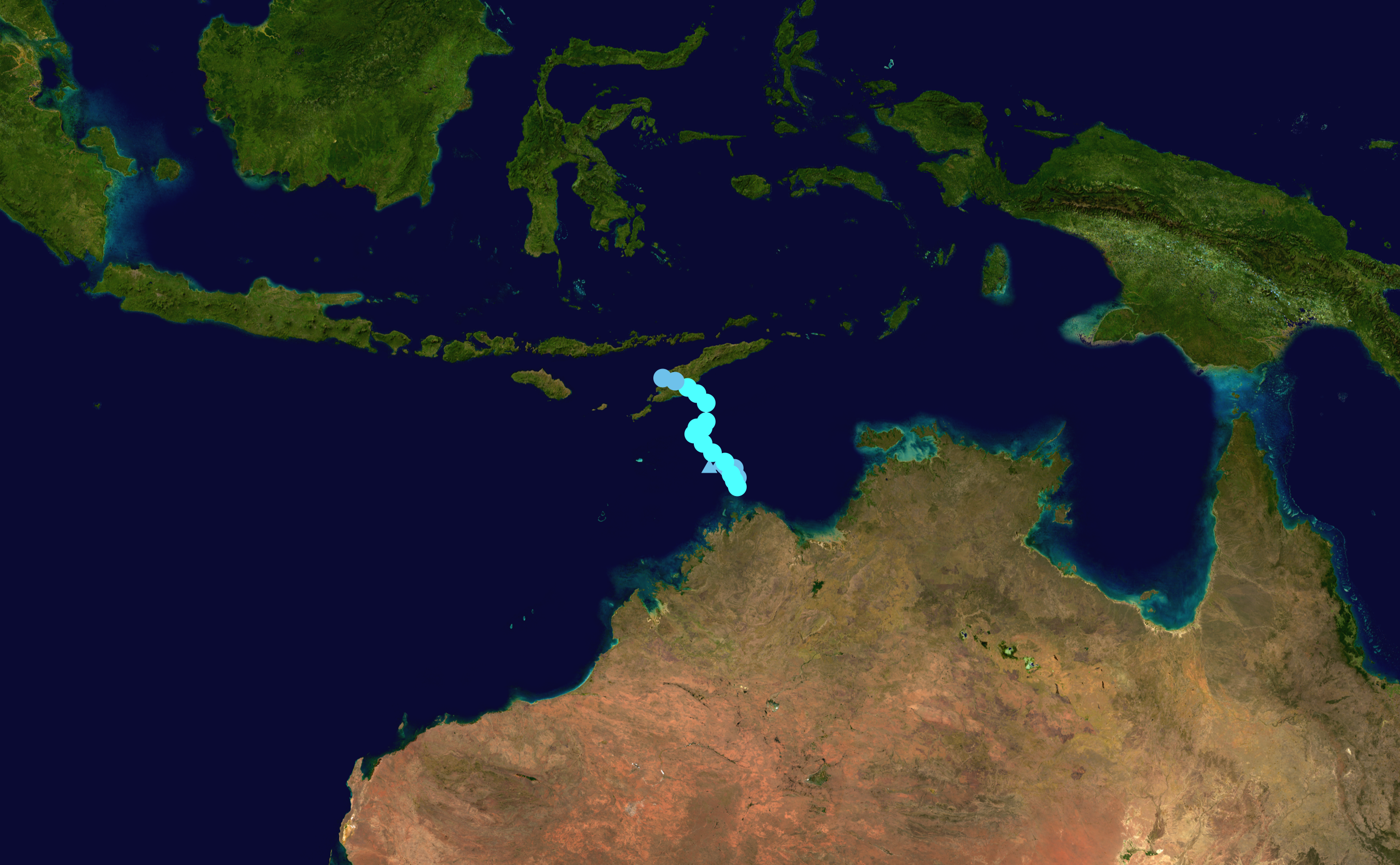
- Duration: 13 April – 18 April
- Peak intensity: 120 km/h (75 mph) (10-min); 985 hPa (mbar)

During 12 April the Australian Bureau of Meteorology reported that Tropical Low 29U, had developed over the Timor Sea to the south of Timor-Leste. Over the next couple of days the system moved southwards towards the Australian state of Kimberly and intensified gradually before it was declared a category 1 tropical cyclone and named Errol by the BoM early on 15 April.

During February 2022, the BoM reanalysed the system and reported Errol had peaked as a Category 3 Severe tropical cyclone, with 10-minute sustained winds of 120 km/h (75 mph).

=== Other systems ===
During 15 December, Tropical Low 04U was located to the northeast of Nhulunbuy, though TCWC Darwin did not mention their low in their next bulletin. On 31 January, Tropical Low 13U developed well over in the Indian Ocean. Tropical Low 19U developed over in the southern Gulf of Carpentaria on 26 February, monitored by TCWC Darwin. 19U was last noted on 1 March as it was close the Northern Territory and Queensland border with a pressure of 1000 hPa. During 5 March, Tropical Low 20U briefly developed about 200 km (120 mi) west of Lockhart River, Queensland.

On 7 March, the BoM reported that Tropical Low 21U had developed within the Coral Sea, about 1,000 km (620 mi) to the northwest of Yeppoon, Queensland, Australia. During that day, the low tracked eastwards, and gradually intensified. On 8 March it continued eastwards. Later that day, the low moved out of the Australian region, entered the South Pacific and was assigned the new designation 12F. Tropical Low 22U briefly developed during 11 March over Kimberley associated within the monsoon trough. Tropical Low 26U, located north of Pilbara coast and Tropical Low 27U, over in the 90° east median, developed on 30 March. Both lows did not intensify further and dissipated while last mentioned in the bulletins of TCWC Perth during 3 April, though 27U moved into the South-West Indian Ocean basin and the MFR gave the designation of 08R. On 14 April, Tropical Low 28U developed to the northwest of New Caledonia until it crossed the basin into the South Pacific the next day.

== Storm names ==
=== Bureau of Meteorology ===
The Australian Bureau of Meteorology monitors all tropical cyclones within the region, and assigns names to tropical cyclones that form outside of the areas of responsibility of TCWC Jakarta and TCWC Port Moresby. The names for the 2010-11 season are listed below:

- Tasha
- Vince
- Zelia
- Anthony
- Bianca
- Carlos
- Dianne
- Errol

=== TCWC Jakarta ===
The tropical cyclone warning centre in Jakarta monitors tropical cyclones from the Equator to 11°S and between the longitudes 90°E and 145°E. If a tropical depression reach tropical cyclone strength within TCWC Jakarta's area of responsibility, it will be assigned the next name from the following list:

- Anggrek

=== Others ===
If a tropical cyclone enters the Australian region from the South Pacific basin (east of 160°E), it will retain the name assigned to it by the Fiji Meteorological Service (FMS) or MetService. Similarly, if a tropical cyclone enters the Australian region from the South-West Indian Ocean cyclone region (west of 90°E), it will retain the name assigned to it on behalf of Météo-France La Réunion by the Sub-Regional Tropical Cyclone Advisory Centres in Mauritius or Madagascar. This season, the following systems were named in this manner:

- Abele (named by Météo-France)
- Yasi (named by FMS)

=== Retirement ===
The Bureau of Meteorology retired the names Tasha and Carlos, replacing them with Taliah and Courtney respectively. The name Yasi was also retired from the FMS and replaced with the name Yvonne for the next list.

== Season effects ==
Name	Dates	Peak intensity			Areas affected	Damage (USD)	Deaths	Ref(s).
Name	Dates	Category	Wind speed	Pressure	Areas affected	Damage (USD)	Deaths	Ref(s).
Anggrek	28 October — 4 November	Tropical low	75 km/h (45 mph)	995 hPa (29.38 inHg)	Cocos (Keeling) Islands	None	None	
Abele	3 — 4 December	Category 2 tropical cyclone	95 km/h (60 mph)	985 hPa (29.09 inHg)	None	None	None	
03U	15 December — 20 December	Tropical low	65 km/h (40 mph)	989 hPa (29.21 inHg)	Western Australia	$77 million	None	
04U	22–24 December	Tropical low	Not specified	Not specified	None	None	None	
Tasha	20 — 25 December	Category 1 tropical cyclone	75 km/h (45 mph)	993 hPa (29.32 inHg)	Queensland	Unknown	1	(Note: Damage from Tropical Cyclones Tasha and Anthony are not known as they both contributed to the 2010–11 Queensland floods, which caused over A$ 30 billion.)
06U	29 December — 5 January	Tropical low	55 km/h (35 mph)	993 hPa (29.32 inHg)	Northern Territory, Western Australia	None	None	
07U	30 December – 2 January	Tropical low	Not specified	Not specified	None	None	None	
08U	31 December – 2 January	Tropical low	Not specified	Not specified	None	None	None	
Vince	9 — 16 January	Category 1 tropical cyclone	75 km/h (45 mph)	986 hPa (29.12 inHg)	None	None	None	
Zelia	13–16 January	Category 4 severe tropical cyclone	185 km/h (115 mph)	943 hPa (27.85 inHg)	None	None	None	
Anthony	21 — 30 January	Category 2 tropical cyclone	95 km/h (60 mph)	989 hPa (29.21 inHg)	Queensland	Minor	None	
Bianca	21 — 30 January	Category 4 severe tropical cyclone	175 km/h (110 mph)	949 hPa (28.02 inHg)	Northern Territory, Western Australia	Unknown	2	
13U	31 January	Tropical low	Not specified	Not specified	None	None	None	
Yasi	31 January - 3 February	Category 5 severe tropical cyclone	205 km/h (125 mph)	929 hPa (27.43 inHg)	Solomon Islands, Australia	$2.69 billion	1	
15U	8–13 February	Tropical low	55 km/h (35 mph)	1000 hPa (29.53 inHg)	None	None	None	
Dianne	14 – 22 February 2011	Category 3 severe tropical cyclone	140 km/h (85 mph)	960 hPa (28.35 inHg)	Western Australia	Minimal	None	
Carlos	15 – 26 February	Category 3 severe tropical cyclone	120 km/h (75 mph)	969 hPa (28.61 inHg)	Northern Territory, Western Australia	$12.3 million	None	
18U	23–28 February	Tropical low	55 km/h (35 mph)	992 hPa (29.29 inHg)	None	None	None	
19U	26 February – 1 March	Tropical low	Not specified	1000 hPa (29.53 inHg)	Northern Territory	None	None	
20U	5 March	Tropical low	Not specified	Not specified	None	None	None	
21U	7–8 March	Tropical low	45 km/h (30 mph)	1004 hPa (29.65 inHg)	None	None	None	
22U	10–15 March	Tropical low	Not specified	Not specified	None	None	None	
23U	10–14 March	Tropical low	Not specified	Not specified	None	None	None	
25U	29 March – 6 April	Category 1 tropical cyclone	75 km/h (45 mph)	994 hPa (29.35 inHg)	Western Australia	None	None	
26U	30 March – 1 April	Tropical low	Not specified	1006 hPa (29.71 inHg)	None	None	None	
27U	30 March – 1 April	Tropical low	Not specified	1006 hPa (29.71 inHg)	None	None	None	
28U	14–15 April	Tropical low	Not specified	Not specified	None	None	None	
Errol	13 – 20 April	Category 3 severe tropical cyclone	120 km/h (75 mph)	985 hPa (29.09 inHg)	West Timor	None	None	
Season aggregates
28 systems	28 October – 20 April		205 km/h (125 mph)	929 hPa (27.43 inHg)		$2.78 billion	4	

== See also ==
- Tropical cyclones in 2010 and 2011
- Australian region tropical cyclone
- List of Southern Hemisphere tropical cyclone seasons
- Atlantic hurricane seasons: 2010, 2011
- Pacific hurricane seasons: 2010, 2011
- Pacific typhoon seasons: 2010, 2011
- North Indian Ocean cyclone seasons: 2010, 2011
- 2010–11 South-West Indian Ocean cyclone season
- 2010–11 South Pacific cyclone season
- South Atlantic tropical cyclone
