= South-West Indian Ocean tropical cyclone =

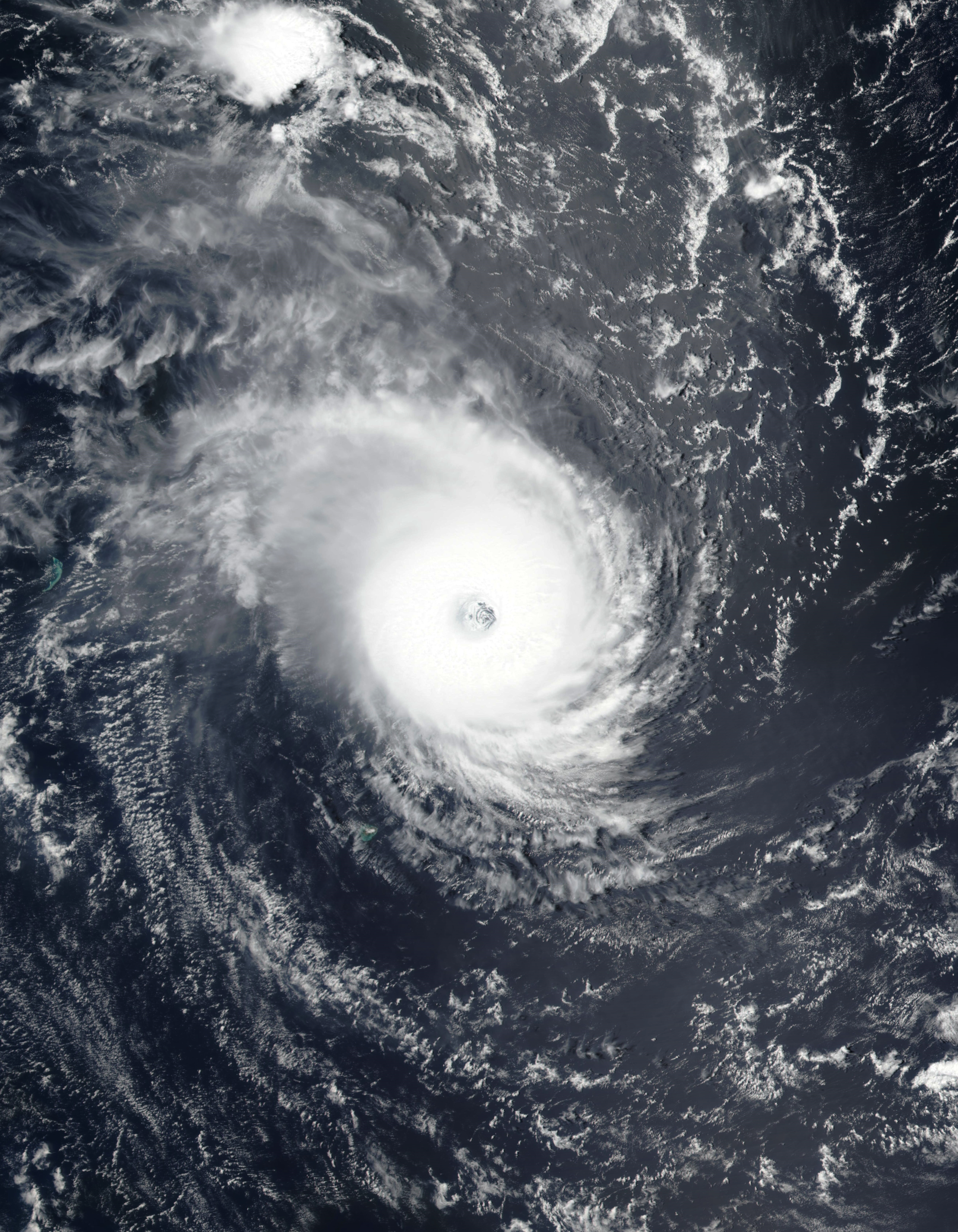
Satellite image of Cyclone Freddy, the longest tropical cyclone ever recorded globally

In the south-west Indian Ocean, tropical cyclones form south of the equator and west of 90° E to the coast of Africa.

== Warnings and nomenclature ==
In 1946, Réunion's first airstrip opened, then called Gillot, and now called Roland Garros Airport. In 1950, the first meteorological station on the island opened at the airport, operated by Météo-France (MFR). The agency began publishing annual reviews in the 1962–63 season. Each year, the Météo-France office (MFR) based on Réunion island issues warnings on tropical cyclones within the basin, which is defined as the waters of the Indian Ocean from the coast of Africa to 90° E, south of the equator. The agency issues the warnings as part of its role as a Regional Specialized Meteorological Center, designated as such in 1993 by the World Meteorological Organization. Intensities are estimated through the Dvorak technique, which utilizes images from satellites by the American National Oceanic and Atmospheric Administration.

The Joint Typhoon Warning Center – a joint United States Navy – United States Air Force task force – also issues tropical cyclone warnings for the region. Wind estimates from Météo-France and most other basins throughout the world are sustained over 10 minutes, while estimates from the United States–based Joint Typhoon Warning Center are sustained over 1 minute. 1-minute winds are about 1.12 times the amount of 10-minute winds.

If a tropical storm in the basin strengthens to attain 10 minute sustained winds of at least 118 km/h (73 mph), the MFR classifies it as a tropical cyclone, equivalent to a hurricane or typhoon (a use of "tropical cyclone" which is more restrictive than the usual definition).

=== History of the basin ===
The first storm in the MFR database of the basin originated on January 11, 1848. In January 1960, the first named storm was Alix, and each subsequent year had a list of storm names. Beginning in 1967, satellites helped locate cyclones in the basin, and in the following year, the MFR began estimating storm intensities from the satellite images. By 1977, the agency was using the Dvorak technique on an unofficial basis, but officially adopted it in 1981. Originally, the basin only extended to 80° E, and while it was extended eastward to the current 90° E, a lack of satellite imagery initially made data uncertain east of 80° E. The World Meteorological Organization designated the MFR as a Regional Tropical Cyclones Advisory Centre in 1988, and upgraded it to a Regional Specialized Meteorological Center in 1993. In May 1998, two Europe-based Meteosat satellites began providing complete coverage of the basin. On July 1, 2002, the MFR shifted the cyclone year to begin on this date and end on June 30 of the following year; previously, the cyclone year began on August 1 and ended on the subsequent July 31. In 2003, the MFR extended their area of warning responsibility to 40°S, having previously been limited to 30°S. During 2011, MFR started a reanalysis project of all tropical systems between 1978 and 1998, with methods such as a Dvorak technique reanalysis and use of microwave imagery. Preliminary results from this reanalysis project include correcting an increasing trend in the number of very intense tropical cyclones in the basin since 1978. This also revealed a seemingly systematic underestimation of tropical cyclone intensities in the past.

== Statistics ==
From the 1980–81 to the 2010–11 season, there was an average of 9.3 tropical storms each year in the basin. A tropical storm has 10-minute winds of at least 65 km/h (40 mph). There are an average of five storms that become tropical cyclones, which have 10-minute winds of at least 120 km/h (75 mph). As of 2002, there was an average of 54 days when tropical systems were active in the basin, of which 20 had tropical cyclones active, or a system with winds of over 120 km/h (75 mph). The median start date for the season was November 17, and the median end date was April 20.

== Climatology ==
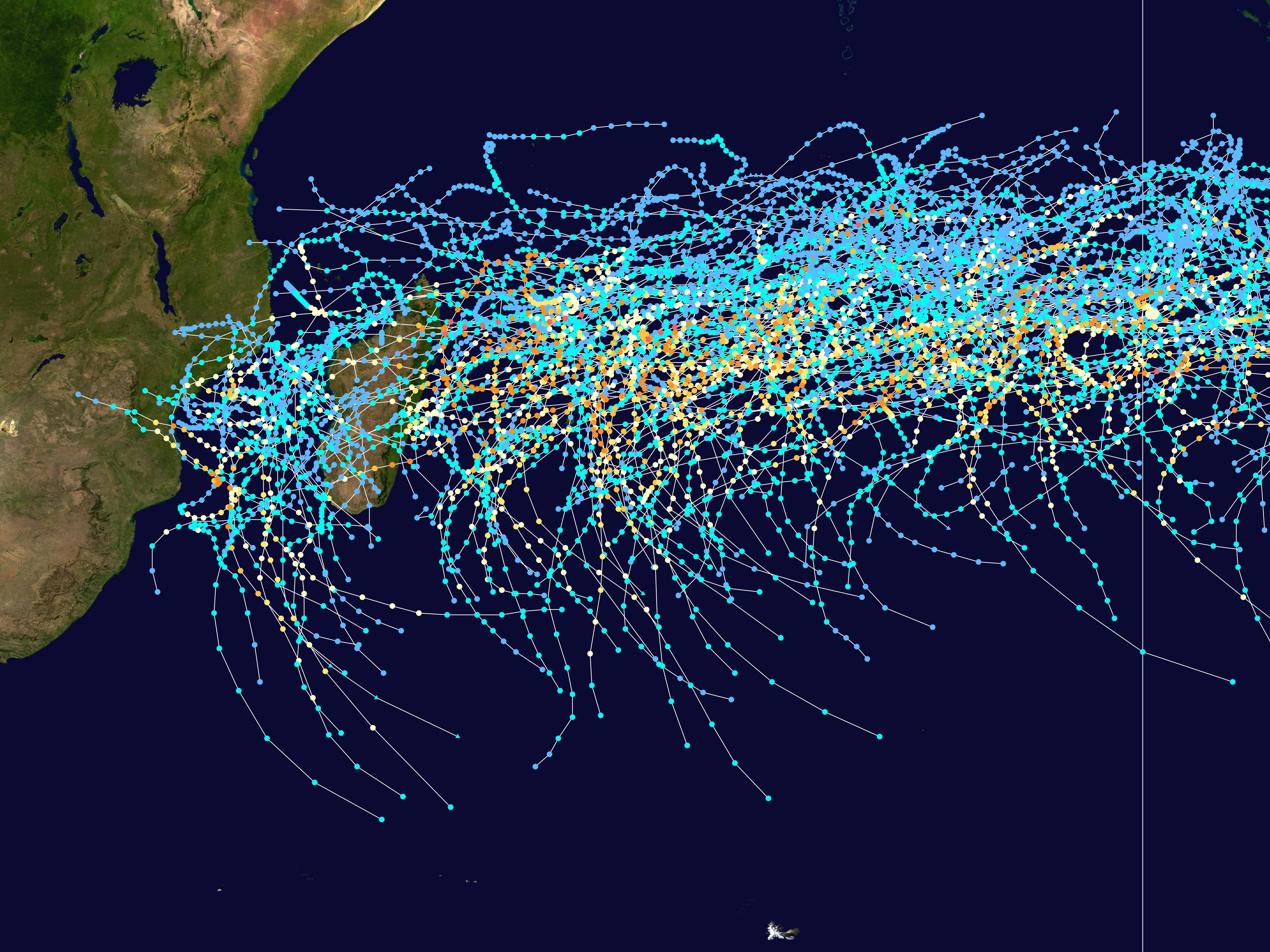
Tracks of storms in the basin from 1980 to 2005

Generally, the monsoon does not cross into the Mozambique Channel until December; as a result, storms rarely form there before that time. From 1948 to 2010, 94 tropical systems developed in the small body of water, of which about half made landfall. Occasionally, small storms form in the Mozambique Channel that resemble Mediterranean cyclones or storms in the northeastern Atlantic Ocean; these systems are well-organised but have weaker convection than typical tropical cyclones, and originate over sea surface temperatures cooler than 26 °C (79 °F). A survey in 2004 conducted by weather expert Gary Padgett found meteorologists divided over whether these storms should be classified as tropical or subtropical.

In an average year, ten tropical depressions or storms strike Madagascar, and most generally do not cause much damage. Occasionally, storms or their remnants move inland over southeastern Africa, bringing heavy rainfall to Zimbabwe.

== Seasons ==
Historical storm formation by month between 1990 and 2026
- Very intense tropical cyclone
- Intense tropical cyclone
- Tropical cyclone
- Severe tropical storm
- Moderate tropical storm
- Tropical depression
- Tropical disturbance

=== 1959 ===
Season	TD	TC	Strongest storm	Deaths	Damage USD	Notes and References
1959–1960	6	8	Carol	48		Features the first officially named tropical cyclone 'Alix'; Included Carol which remains one of the most powerful storms in Mauritian history, with a central pressure of 942 hPa. It destroyed over 70,000 homes and led to the "Carol villages" housing reconstruction projects.

=== 1960s ===
Season	TD	TC	Strongest storm	Deaths	Damage USD	Notes and References
1960–1961	6	1	Doris			Featured Cyclone Jenny, which is infamous for its rapid forward speed and no warning in advance for Mauritius.
1961–1962	14	5	Daisy; Maud			
1962–1963	10	4	TC Delia			
1963–1964	12	4	ITC Giselle			Notable for Cyclone Danielle, which reached Very Intense status. It struck Madagascar’s east coast, causing significant loss of life and destroying substantial portions of the vanilla and coffee crops.
1964–1965	14	1	TC Freda			
1965–1966	17	5	ITC Ivy	3		
1966–1967	13	2	TC Gilberte			
1967–1968	8	4	ITC Georgette; ITC Janine	38		
1968–1969	8	4	TC Dany; TC Helene	82		
1969–1970	13	8	VITC Jane	30		

=== 1970s ===
Season	TD	MTS	TC	ITC	VITC	Strongest storm	Deaths	Damage USD	Notes and References
1970–1971	16	11	8	4	0	ITC Maggie-Muriel	32		
1971–1972	9	7	2	1	0	ITC Fabienne	7		Featured Fabienne, which struck Rodrigues and Mauritius. It was particularly destructive in Rodrigues, where it destroyed nearly 70% of the housing and caused severe agricultural losses.
1972–1973	13	11	4	2	1	VITC Lydie	11		
1973–1974	8	7	1	0	0	TC Deidre-Delinda			
1974–1975	10	6	2	0	0	TC Gervaise	9		Marked by Cyclone Gervaise, one of the most famous storms in Mauritian history. It produced a record wind gust of 280 km/h at Mon Désert and led to a complete overhaul of building codes on the island.
1975–1976	8	6	1	1	0	ITC Terry-Danae			
1976–1977	9	8	3	1	0	ITC Jack-Io	301		
1977–1978	14	12	2	1	0	ITC Aurore	2		
1978–1979	10	6	4	2	0	ITC Celine	74		
1979–1980	11	11	4	2	0	ITC Viola-Claudette	30		Featured, Hyacinthe, which holds the world record for the most rainfall from a single tropical system (over 6,000 mm on Réunion).

=== 1980s ===
Season	TD	MTS	TC	ITC	Strongest storm	Deaths	Damage USD	Notes and References
1980–81	12	10	3	2	VITC Florine			Featured Cyclone Florine, which passed just north of Réunion. It produced immense rainfall, including a record-breaking 1,161 mm in 24 hours at Foc-Foc.
1981–82	14	10	5	2	ITC Chris-Damia	100	$250 million	
1982–83	6	3	0	0	STS Bemany and Elinah	33	$23 million	Least active season on record, tied with the 2010–11 season. Featured, Cyclone Elinah which made a rare and devastating landfall on the Comoro Islands (Comoros), causing significant damage to infrastructure.
1983–84	14	11	4	4	ITC Andry, Bakoly, Annette-Jaminy, and Kamisy	356	$496 million	Included Domoina caused 100-year floods in South Africa and record rainfall in Swaziland (now Eswatini).
1984–85	9	9	1	0	TC Helisaonina	0	Unknown	Helisaonina holds the record for the longest single name assigned in the basin at 11 characters.
1985–86	13	13	5	1	ITC Erinesta	99	$150 million	
1986–87	10	8	1	0	TC Daodo	10	$2 million	
1987–88	11	11	4	1	ITC Gasitao	100	$10 million	
1988–89	12	11	6	0	TC Leon-Hanitra and Krissy	11	$217 million	Notable for Cyclone Firinga, which struck Réunion in January 1989. It caused immense damage due to wind gusts exceeding 200 km/h and remains one of the "benchmark" storms for disaster preparedness on the island.
1989–90	9	9	5	1	ITC Walter-Gregoara	46	$1.5 million	
Totals	110	95	34	11	Chris-Damia	755	≥$1.15 billion	

=== 1990s ===
Season	TD	MTS	TC	ITC	VITC	Strongest storm	Deaths	Damage USD	Notes and References
1990–91	11	7	3	0	0	TC Bella	88		
1991–92	14	11	3	1	0	ITC Harriet-Heather	2		
1992–93	18	11	4	2	0	ITC Edwina	20		Features, Cyclone Colina, which made a direct hit on Réunion. It was the first cyclone for the eye to track over the island since 1962 (Note: Number of tropical storms includes one subtropical depression that had winds above 65 km/h (40 mph).)
1993–94	18	14	8	4	0	ITC Geralda	558		Includes, Geralda which struck the island as a Category 5-equivalent storm. It is often called the "Cyclone of the Century" for Madagascar, killing over 200 people and destroying the homes of 500,000.
1994–95	20	11	5	3	0	ITC Marlene			
1995–96	21	11	6	3	0	ITC Bonita	11		
1996–97	21	12	5	3	0	ITC Daniella	311	$50 million	
1997–98	16	5	1	0	0	TC Anacelle	88		
1998–99	14	6	2	2	0	ITC Evrina	2		
1999–00	14	9	4	3	1	VITC Hudah	1,073	$800 million	The fourth deadliest season on record. Cyclone Hudah, one of the deadliest, with over 1,000 fatalities across Mozambique and Madagascar.
Totals	167	97	41	21	1	Hudah	2,153	≥$850 million	

=== 2000s ===
Season	TD	MTS	TC	ITC	VITC	Strongest storm	Deaths	Damage USD	Notes and References
2000–01	11	6	4	2	0	ITC Ando	4		
2001–02	15	11	9	5	1	VITC Hary	52	$287 million	
2002–03	14	12	7	3	0	ITC Kalunde	169	$6.7 million	Notable for Dina, which caused significant damage to Mauritius and Réunion.
2003–04	15	10	5	3	1	VITC Gafilo	396	$250 million	This season featured the most intense storm on record in the basin, Gafilo.
2004–05	18	10	4	3	1	VITC Juliet	253		
2005–06	13	6	3	2	0	ITC Carina	75		
2006–07	15	10	7	6	0	ITC Dora and Favio	188	$337 million	
2007–08	15	13	6	4	0	ITC Hondo	123	$38.1 million	Notable for Ivan, which made a catastrophic landfall on Sainte-Marie Island and mainland Madagascar as an Intense Tropical Cyclone, killing nearly 100 people and leaving 190,000 homeless.
2008–09	12	10	2	2	0	ITC Fanele and Gael	30		
2009–10	16	9	5	4	1	VITC Edzani	40		
Totals	144	97	52	34	4	Gafilo	1,339	≥$919 million	

=== 2010s ===
Season	TD	MTS	TC	ITC	VITC	Strongest storm	Deaths	Damage USD	Notes and References
2010–11	9	3	2	0	0	TC Bingiza	34		Least active season on record, tied with the 1982–83 season.
2011–12	14	10	3	2	0	ITC Funso	164		
2012–13	11	10	7	3	0	ITC Felleng	35	$46 million	
2013–14	15	11	5	5	2	VITC Hellen	11	$89.2 million	One of the fastest intensifying storms in the Mozambique Channel, Hellen.
2014–15	14	11	4	3	2	VITC Bansi	111	$46.4 million	
2015–16	8	8	3	3	1	VITC Fantala	13	$4.5 million	Features the strongest storm by windspeed recorded in the basin, Fantala.
2016–17	7	5	3	1	0	ITC Enawo	341	$137 million	
2017–18	9	8	6	3	0	ITC Cebile	108	$38.2 million	
2018–19	15	15	11	9	0	ITC Kenneth	1,672	≥$3.65 billion	Most active, second costliest, and deadliest season on record Features Idai, deadliest cyclone on record and second costliest in basin history. Includes Kenneth, the strongest tropical cyclone to make landfall in Mozambique since modern records began.
2019–20	12	10	6	3	1	VITC Ambali	45	$25 million	Includes Ambali, the fastest intensification in the Southern Hemisphere, strengthening from a Tropical Depression to a Very Intense Tropical Cyclone in just 24 hours.
Totals	112	89	49	32	6	Fantala	2,244	≥$2.7 billion	

=== 2020s ===
Season	TD	MTS	TC	ITC	VITC	Strongest storm	Deaths	Damage USD	Notes and References
2020–21	16	12	7	2	2	VITC Faraji; VITC Habana	56	$90.1 million	Features two very intense tropical cyclones named in the basin. Record third consecutive season for a storm to develop before the official start (Alicia).
2021–22	13	12	5	5	0	ITC Batsirai	376	$380 million	Latest start to an SWIO season.
2022–23	10	9	5	3	2	VITC Darian	1,483	>$1.55 billion	Features two very intense tropical cyclones named in the Australian Region. Features Freddy, the longest lasting tropical cyclone ever recorded. Third deadliest season.
2023–24	12	10	7	2	0	ITC Djoungou	25	$536 million	Features Belal, the first to make landfall over Réunion since Hondo in 2008, and the strongest to strike the island since Firinga in 1989.
2024–25	15	13	9	6	1	VITC Vince	189+	>$4.1 billion	Features Bheki, the most intense off-season tropical cyclone since Beni in 2003. Features Chido, the strongest system to ever make landfall on Mayotte since records began. Features Kanto, the first officially named subtropical storm in basin history. Costliest South-West Indian Ocean cyclone season on record. Tied as the third-busiest season in the South-West Indian Ocean.
2025–26	13	11	6	4	0	ITC Horacio	75+	>$2.48 billion	Notable for three pre-season storms and one depression (01, Awo, Blossom, and Chenge) which developed between July and October. Features Awo, the first named storm to develop in August since Aline in 1969. Features Gezani, a catastrophic storm for Toamasina, where approximately 75% of buildings were reportedly destroyed. It caused an estimated $2 billion in damage to Madagascar alone, was also the costliest storm to hit Madagascar on record and the third costliest storm in the basin on record. Features Juluka, the second officially named subtropical storm in basin history, following Kanto from the 2024–25 season Third costliest South-West Indian Ocean cyclone season on record.
2026–27	1	1	0	0	0	STS Agueda			
Totals	78	67	39	22	5	Darian	2,204+	>$9.136 billion	

== See also ==
- Tropical cyclone
- Atlantic hurricane season
- Pacific hurricane season
- Pacific typhoon season
- North Indian Ocean tropical cyclone
- Australian region tropical cyclone
- South Pacific tropical cyclone
- South Atlantic tropical cyclone
- Mediterranean tropical-like cyclone
