= 2010–11 South-West Indian Ocean cyclone season =

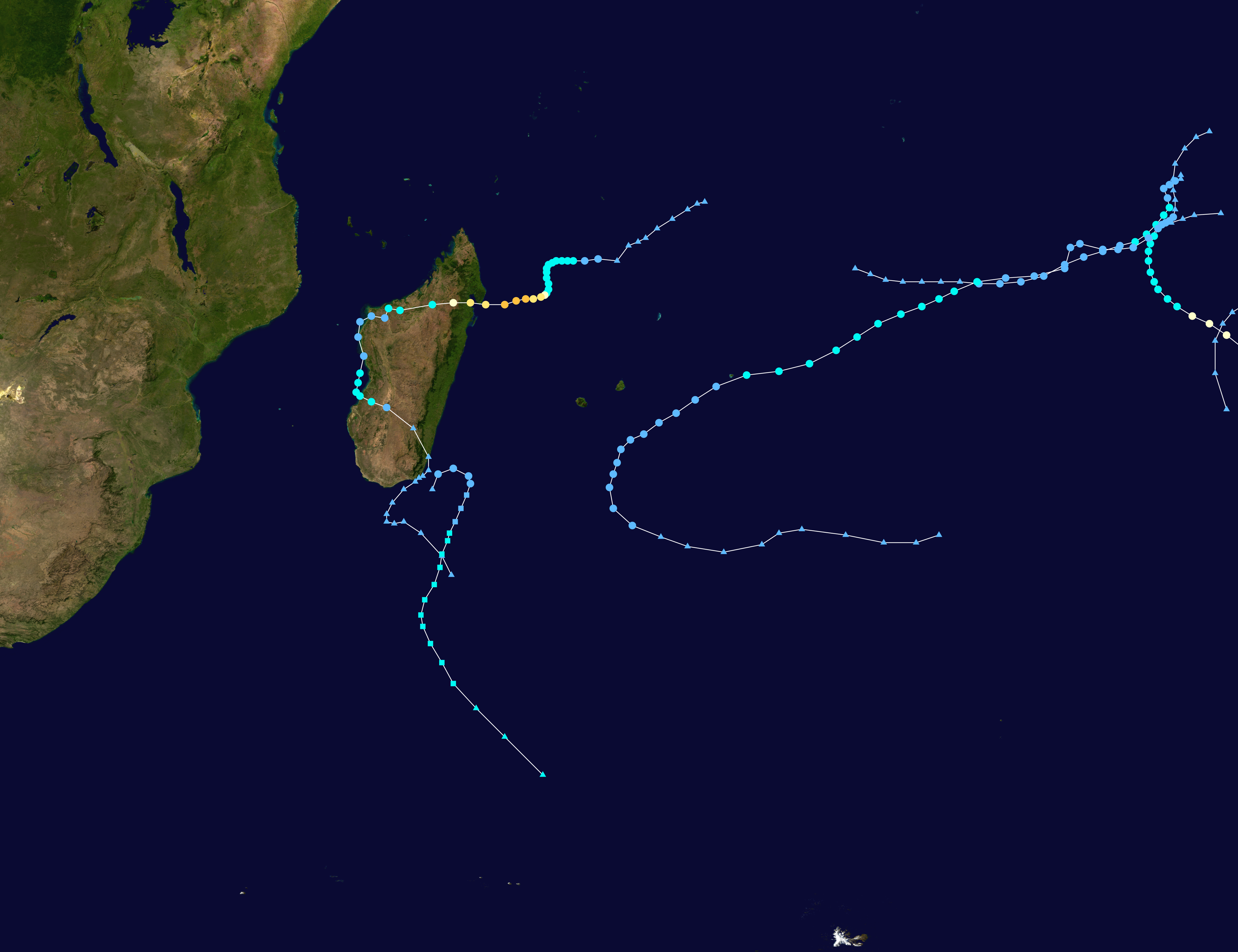
- Season summary map

Seasonal boundaries
- First system formed: 25 October 2010
- Last system dissipated: 16 April 2011

Strongest storm
- Name: Bingiza
  - Maximum winds: 155 km/h (100 mph) (10-minute sustained)
  - Lowest pressure: 957 hPa (mbar)

Seasonal statistics
- Total disturbances: 9
- Total depressions: 6 (record low, tied with 1975–76)
- Total storms: 3 (record low, tied with 1982–83)
- Tropical cyclones: 2
- Total fatalities: 34 total
- Total damage: Unknown

Related articles
- 2010–11 Australian region cyclone season; 2010–11 South Pacific cyclone season

The 2010–11 South-West Indian Ocean cyclone season was the least active cyclone season on record in the basin, tied with 1982–83, producing only three systems of gale intensity. This was due to cooler than normal water temperatures and the Walker circulation – a broad atmospheric circulation – causing unusually moist conditions in the eastern Indian Ocean and unusually dry conditions in the western Indian Ocean. The basin includes the waters of the ocean south of the equator and west of 90º E to the eastern coast of Africa.

There were nine tropical or subtropical cyclones during the season, including five weak tropical disturbances or depressions, mostly in the northeastern portion of the basin or to the east of Madagascar. The first of these systems developed on 25 October 2010, which had its origins in the northeastern portion of the basin. On 29 November, the first named storm – Abele – also formed in the same area, strengthening to become one of the season's two tropical cyclones – storms with maximum sustained winds of at least 120 km/h (75 mph). The strongest system of the season was Cyclone Bingiza, which attained peak winds of 160 km/h (100 mph) off the northeastern coast of Madagascar in February. Bingiza was also the only storm to cause severe effects on land, causing heavy damage and 34 fatalities across Madagascar. Moderate Tropical Storm Cherono developed in March and traversed much of the ocean, only brushing by the island of Rodrigues. The final system was a subtropical depression that intensified south of Madagascar, becoming extratropical on 16 April to end the season.

== Season forecast and summary ==
On 22 October 2010, the MMS released their seasonal outlook and predicted that there would be 8–10 named storms within the basin during the season. At the end of December, the MMS issued an updated seasonal outlook, predicting that only 6–8 named storms would develop.

As the season began, strong La Niña conditions persisted across the Pacific and Indian oceans, causing an increase in cyclonic flow near the equator over the Indian Ocean. However, atmospheric conditions over the basin significantly decreased tropical cyclogenesis. The Walker circulation – a broad atmospheric circulation – caused unusually moist conditions in the eastern Indian Ocean while producing an increase in subsidence and unusually dry conditions in the western Indian Ocean. In addition, sea surface temperatures were below normal from 5°–15° S and west of 90° E, which limited storm formation near the Chagos Archipelago, typically a common area of formation. By the end of the season, there were only three named storms, the fewest in 50 years, although there was also a subtropical cyclone with gale-force winds that could have been named. In terms of total days in which cyclones were active, the season was slightly behind the 1982–83 season, thus making the 2010–11 season the second-quietest on record. The season also marked a global trend of decreasing tropical cyclone activity over the preceding five years, although the basin experienced a sudden shift toward increased activity in the subsequent season.

Météo-France's meteorological office in Réunion (MFR) – the official Regional Specialized Meteorological Center for the South-West Indian Ocean – tracked and named all tropical cyclones from the east coast of Africa to 90° E. The Joint Typhoon Warning Center (JTWC), which is a joint United States Navy – United States Air Force task force that issues tropical cyclone warnings for the region, also issued advisories for storms during the season.

== Systems ==
=== Tropical Depression 01 ===
- Tropical depression (MFR)
- Tropical storm (SSHWS)
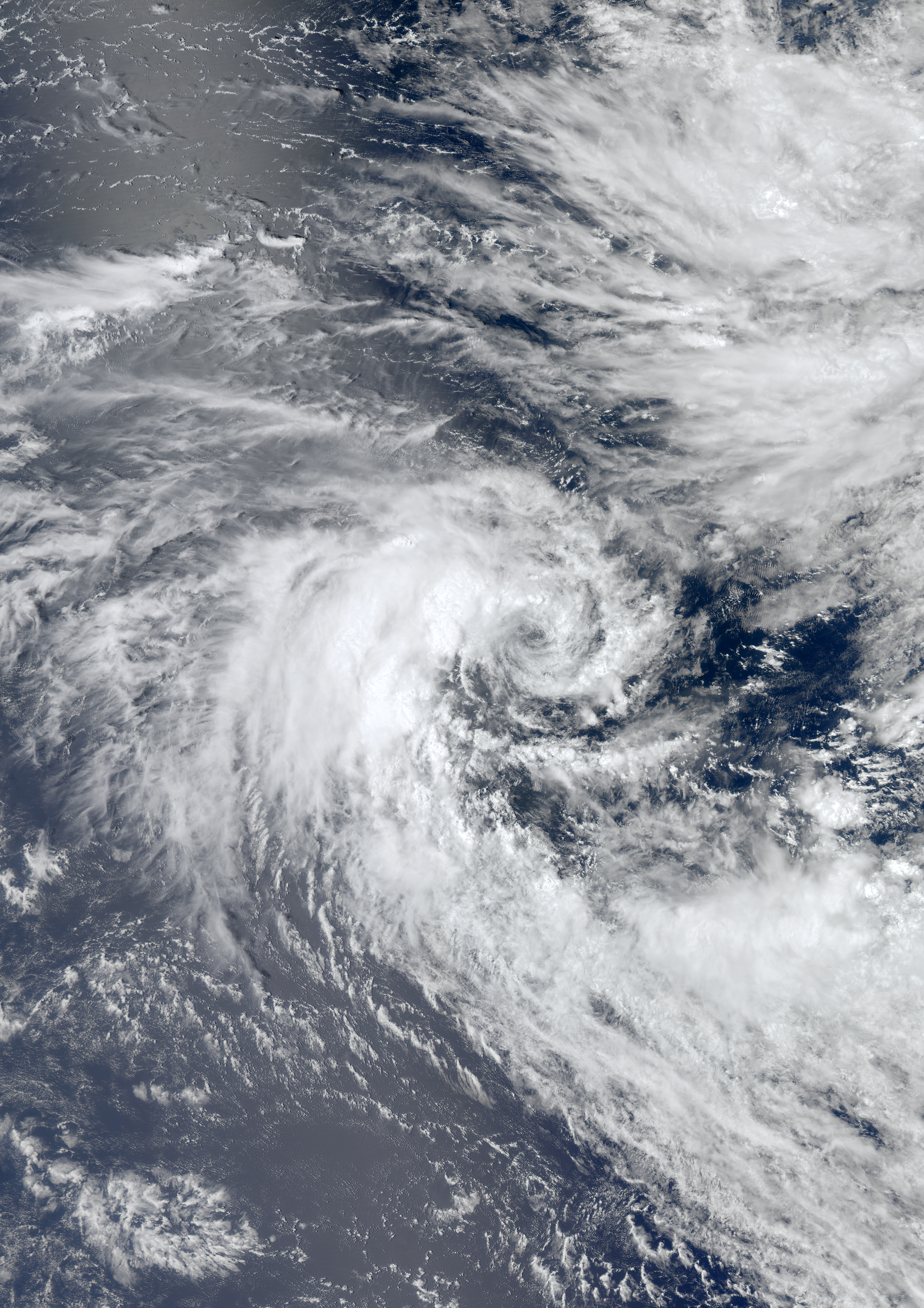
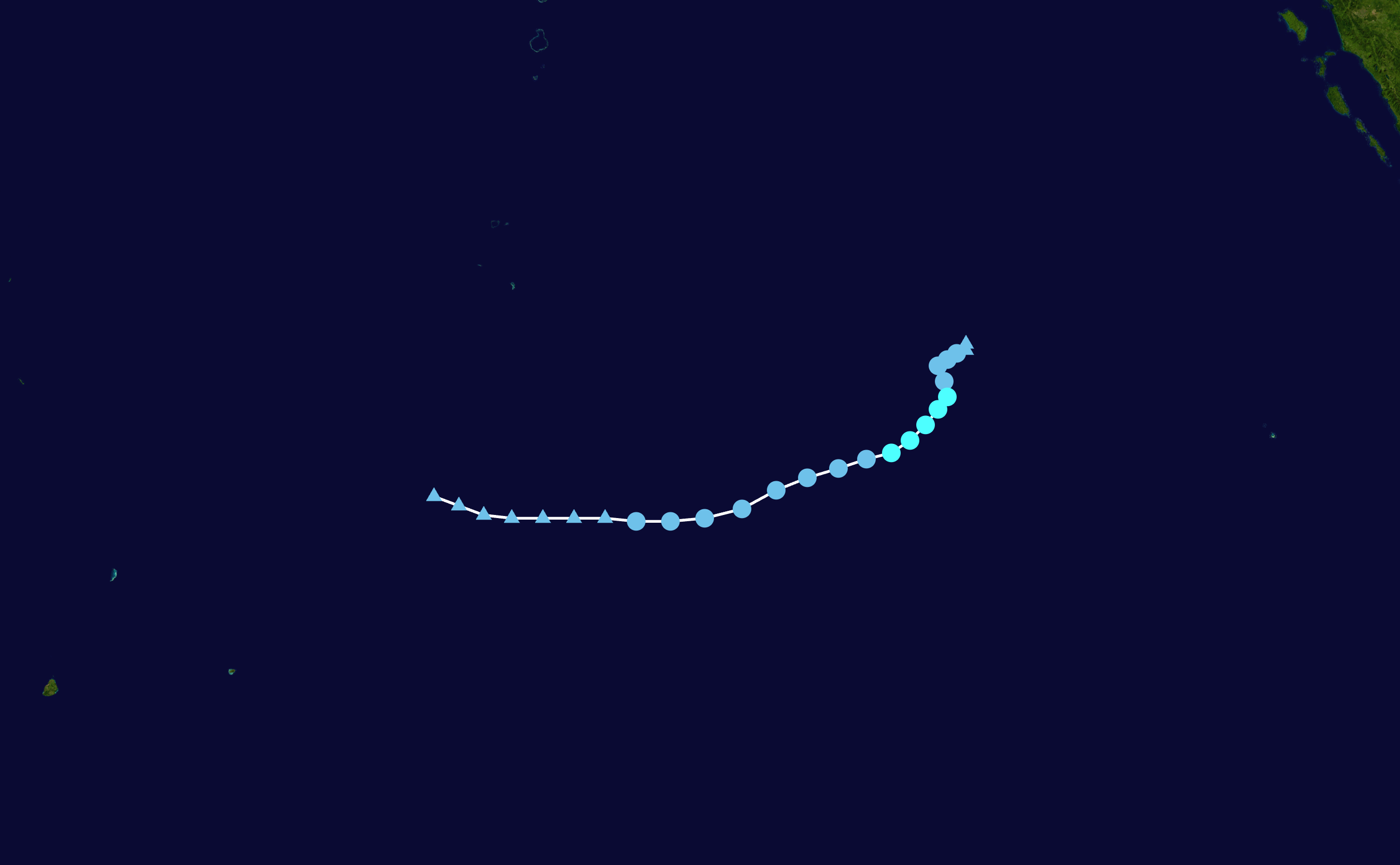
- Duration: 25 October – 29 October
- Peak intensity: 55 km/h (35 mph) (10-min); 997 hPa (mbar)

For two days toward the end of October, an area of convection persisted within the equatorial trough, east-southeast of the Chagos Archipelago. With a ridge to the south, the system moved generally southwestward. Initially, strong wind shear exposed the circulation, although the system had good inflow from the south. At 12:00 UTC on 25 October, the MFR designated the system as Tropical Disturbance 01, and on the next day upgraded it to a tropical depression, estimating winds of 55 km/h (35 mph). Also on 26 October, the JTWC classified the system as Tropical Cyclone 01S about 1,575 km (980 mi) east-southeast of Diego Garcia, estimating peak winds of 65 km/h (40 mph), or a minimal tropical storm. This followed a decrease in wind shear and an increase in convection over the center. Persistent wind shear prevented the system from organizing, causing the thunderstorms to be removed from the center. The JTWC discontinued advisories on the cyclone on 27 October, and on the same day the MFR downgraded it to a tropical disturbance. On 29 October, the MFR issued their final advisory on the system. The remnants continued to the west-southwest, occasionally producing thunderstorms through early November.

=== Tropical Cyclone Abele ===
- Tropical cyclone (MFR)
- Category 1 tropical cyclone (SSHWS)
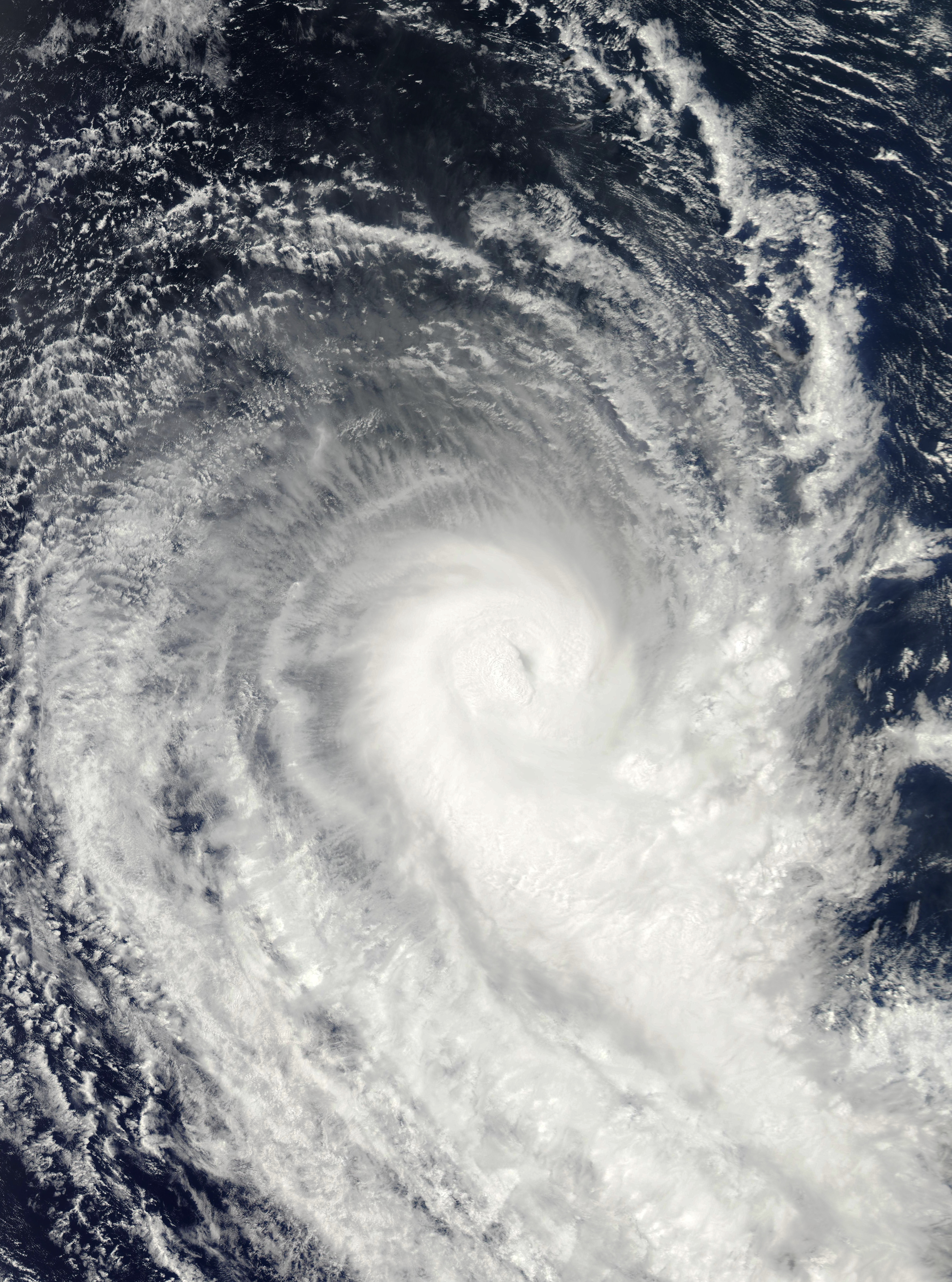
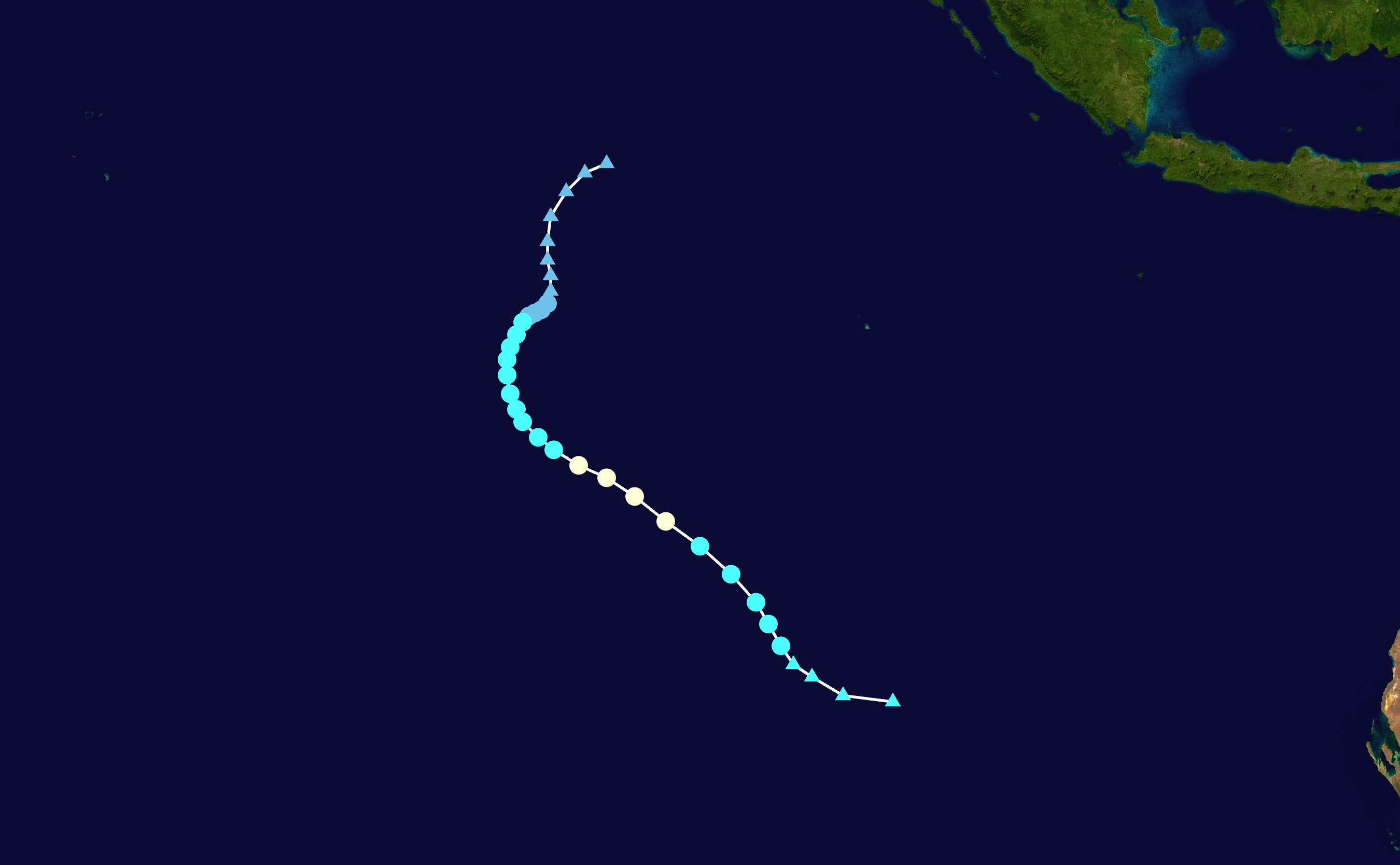
- Duration: 28 November – 2 December (exited basin)
- Peak intensity: 130 km/h (80 mph) (10-min); 974 hPa (mbar)

On 23 November, an area of convection persisted southwest of Sumatra within the Intertropical Convergence Zone (ITCZ), accompanied by a poorly defined circulation. Initially the system remained nearly stationary, although it began drifting to the southwest due to a weakness in the subtropical ridge. Decreasing wind shear and improved inflow favored further development. On 28 November, the MFR designated the system as a zone of disturbed weather in the far northeastern portion of the basin. Early the next day, the agency upgraded the system to Tropical Disturbance 02 after the convection organized further. Also on 29 November, the TCWC Perth classified the disturbance as Tropical Low 02U, and the JTWC designated it as Tropical Cyclone 03S about 1,295 km (805 mi) west of the Cocos (Keeling) Islands.

After the storm's development, the convection pulsed around the circulation, and was initially disrupted by wind shear in the region. Despite the circulation being exposed from the thunderstorms, the MFR upgraded the disturbance to a depression on 30 November, and further to Moderate Tropical Storm Abele on 1 December. By that time, the convection had consolidated over the center, which developed an eye amid lower wind shear. The MFR upgraded Abele to a severe tropical storm and later a tropical cyclone on 2 December, estimating peak 10 minute winds of 130 km/h (80 mph). The JTWC assessed 1 minute winds of 150 km/h (95 mph). By that time, Abele had turned to the south and southeast ahead of an approaching trough. Cooler water temperatures and increased wind shear caused the convection to weaken, and the winds dropped accordingly. Late on 2 December, Abele crossed 90°E into the Australian region; the storm continued weakening and later became extratropical on 4 December, dissipating the next day.

=== Tropical Depression 03 ===
- Tropical depression (MFR)
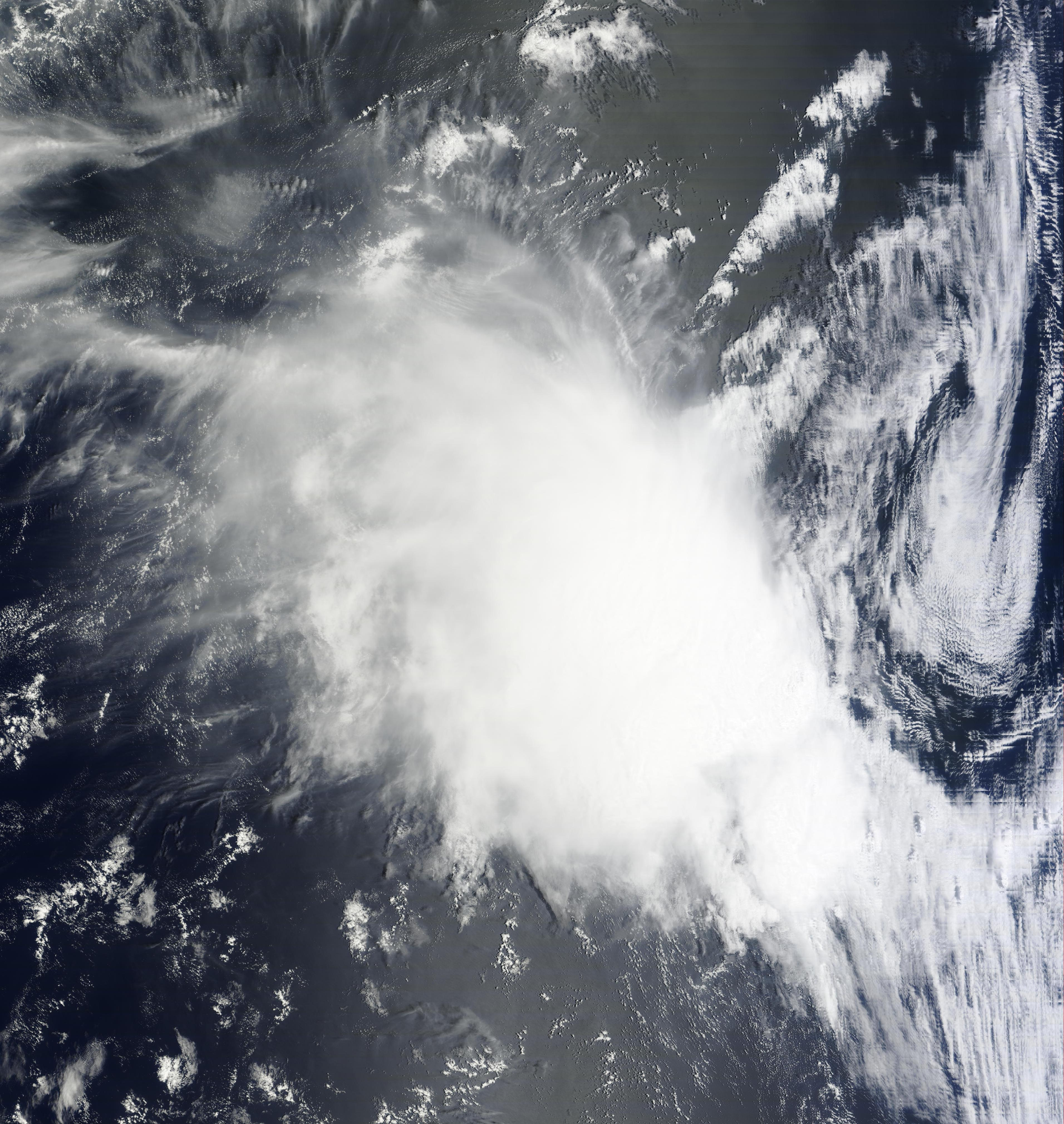
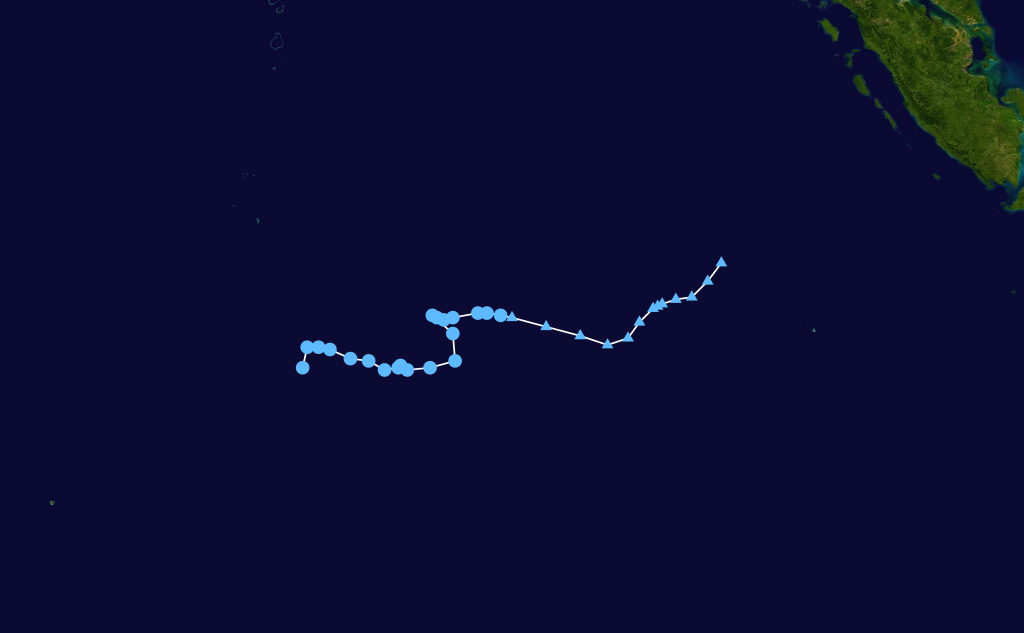
- Duration: 2 January – 3 January
- Peak intensity: 55 km/h (35 mph) (10-min); 996 hPa (mbar)

On December 28, the ITCZ spurred an increase in convection in the northeastern portion of the basin. An elongated low-pressure area developed by 31 December, accompanied by intermittent thunderstorms. The system slowly consolidated, and the circulation center was exposed but well-defined. Despite moderate wind shear, the convection organized into rainbands on the system's southern periphery. On 2 January, the MFR classified the system as Tropical Disturbance 03, and later that day upgraded it to a tropical depression. However, persistent shear caused the convection to diminish on 3 January, which exposed the circulation. As a result, the MFR discontinued advisories on the system that day. The remnants produced scattered convection while moving west-southwestward. By 10 January, the circulation was still observed, although it was difficult to track. Two days later, the system turned southward, and by 15 January, the convection became more persistent as the system approached northeastern Madagascar. That day, the JTWC issued a Tropical Cyclone Formation Alert based on the improved appearance on satellite imagery. At around 05:00 UTC on 16 January, the remnants of the depression struck Madagascar near Fenoarivo Atsinanana, and the system rapidly dissipated over land.

=== Tropical Cyclone Bingiza ===
- Tropical cyclone (MFR)
- Category 3 tropical cyclone (SSHWS)
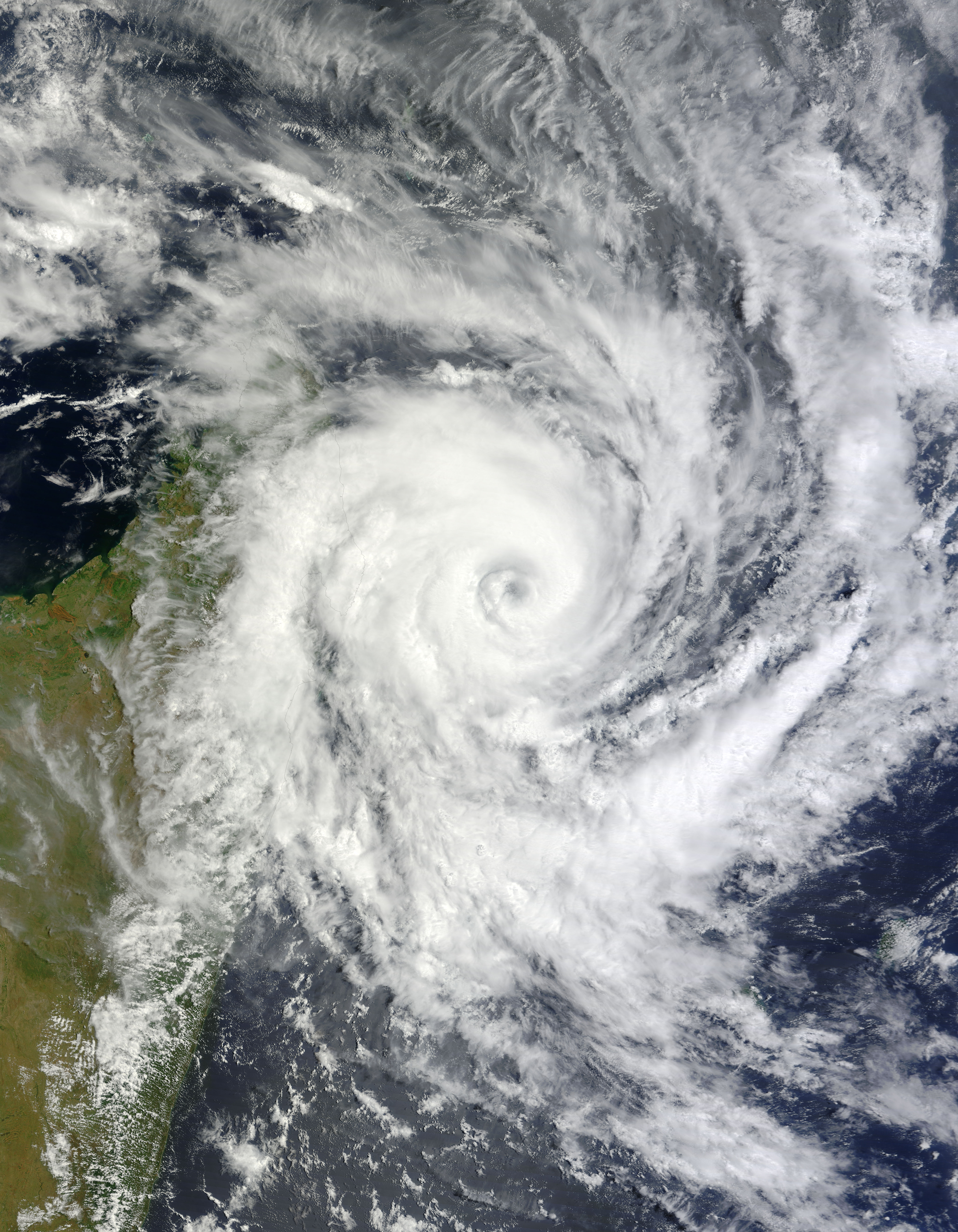
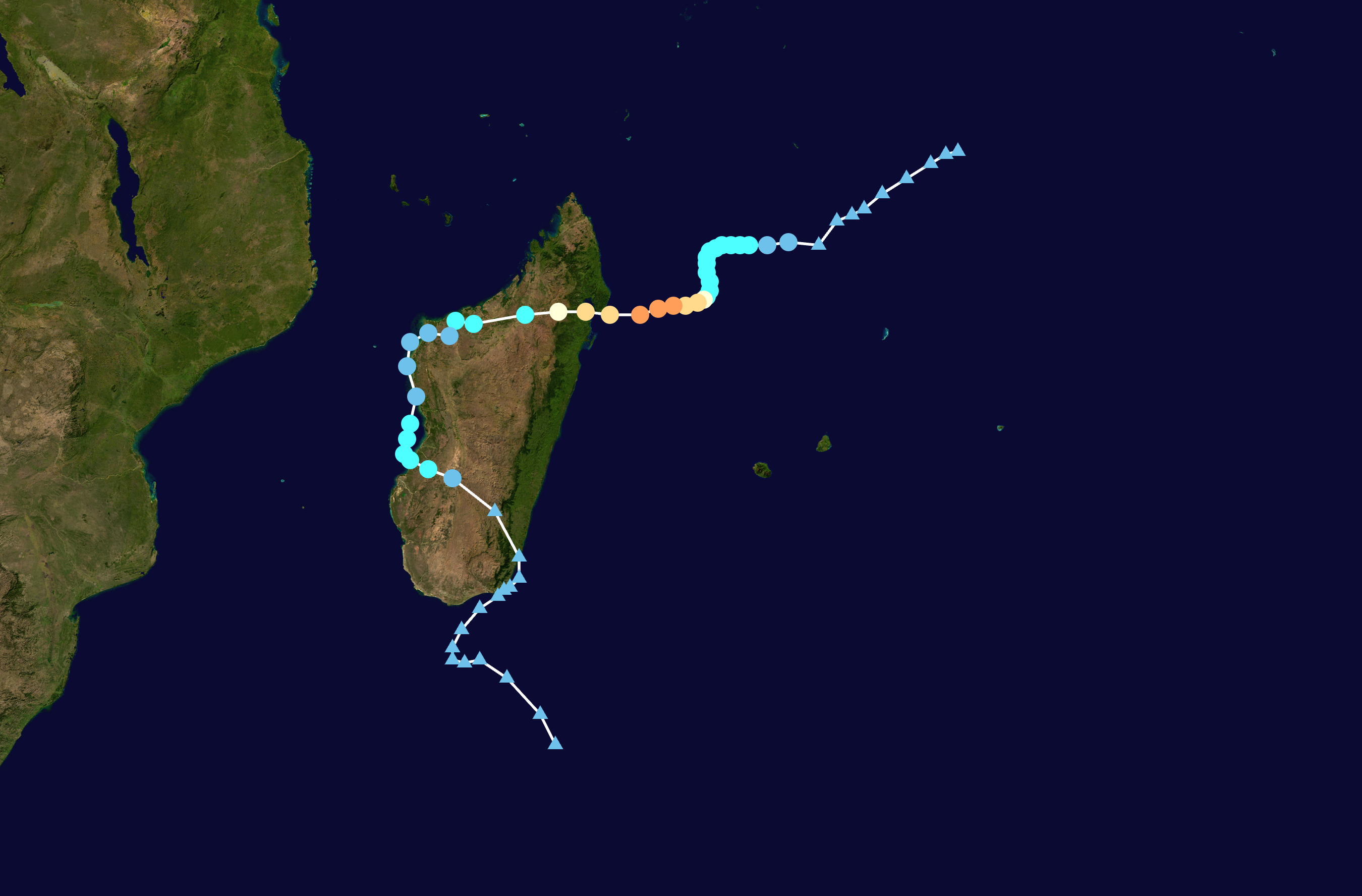
- Duration: 9 February – 17 February
- Peak intensity: 155 km/h (100 mph) (10-min); 957 hPa (mbar)

A zone of disturbed weather developed on 6 February well northeast of Madagascar. For the next few days, the system meandered southwestward, becoming Tropical Disturbance 05 on 8 February. By late the next day, the system had intensified into Moderate Tropical Storm Bingiza, and the JTWC classified it as Tropical Cyclone 13S. After two days of meandering without strengthening, the storm turned to the southwest on 12 February due to a ridge to the south building toward Madagascar, Later that day an eye became apparent on satellite imagery, and Bingiza intensified to tropical cyclone status. Early on 13 February, the cyclone attained peak 10 minute winds of 155 km/h (95 mph), and the JTWC estimated peak 1 minute winds of 185 km/h (115 mph). The cyclone moved ashore in northeastern Madagascar on 14 February and quickly weakened as it crossed the country. It emerged into the Mozambique Channel as a weak tropical disturbance, but almost immediately turned southward and moved ashore western Madagascar. The storm again reached open waters on 16 February, and briefly reintensified into a tropical storm. On 17 February, Bingiza made its final landfall near Morondava, and once again weakened over land. Late on 18 February the system reached open waters, which became extratropical two days later.

Cyclone Bingiza was the only main storm to affect Madagascar during the season. It dropped heavy rainfall, peaking at 276.3 mm (10.88 in), in addition to the strong winds near the landfall point. In Vinanivao, located along the Masoala peninsula, the cyclone destroyed half of the buildings as well as the roads and bridges, leaving it only accessible by boat. The high winds caused heavy crop damage, including to rice and banana, which left minimal food supplies in some areas. Overall, the cyclone destroyed 405.23 km^{2} (156.46 mi^{2}) of rice fields, as well as 101.67 km^{2} (39.26 mi^{2}) of other crops. Across its path, Bingiza destroyed 25,464 houses and damaged 36 schools, and caused 34 deaths in the country. The storm's outer circulation also dropped heavy rainfall in the Comoros, peaking at 770 mm (30 in) in the capital Moroni, and increased moist air over Malawi, Mozambique, and Tanzania.

=== Moderate Tropical Storm Cherono ===
- Moderate tropical storm (MFR)
- Tropical storm (SSHWS)
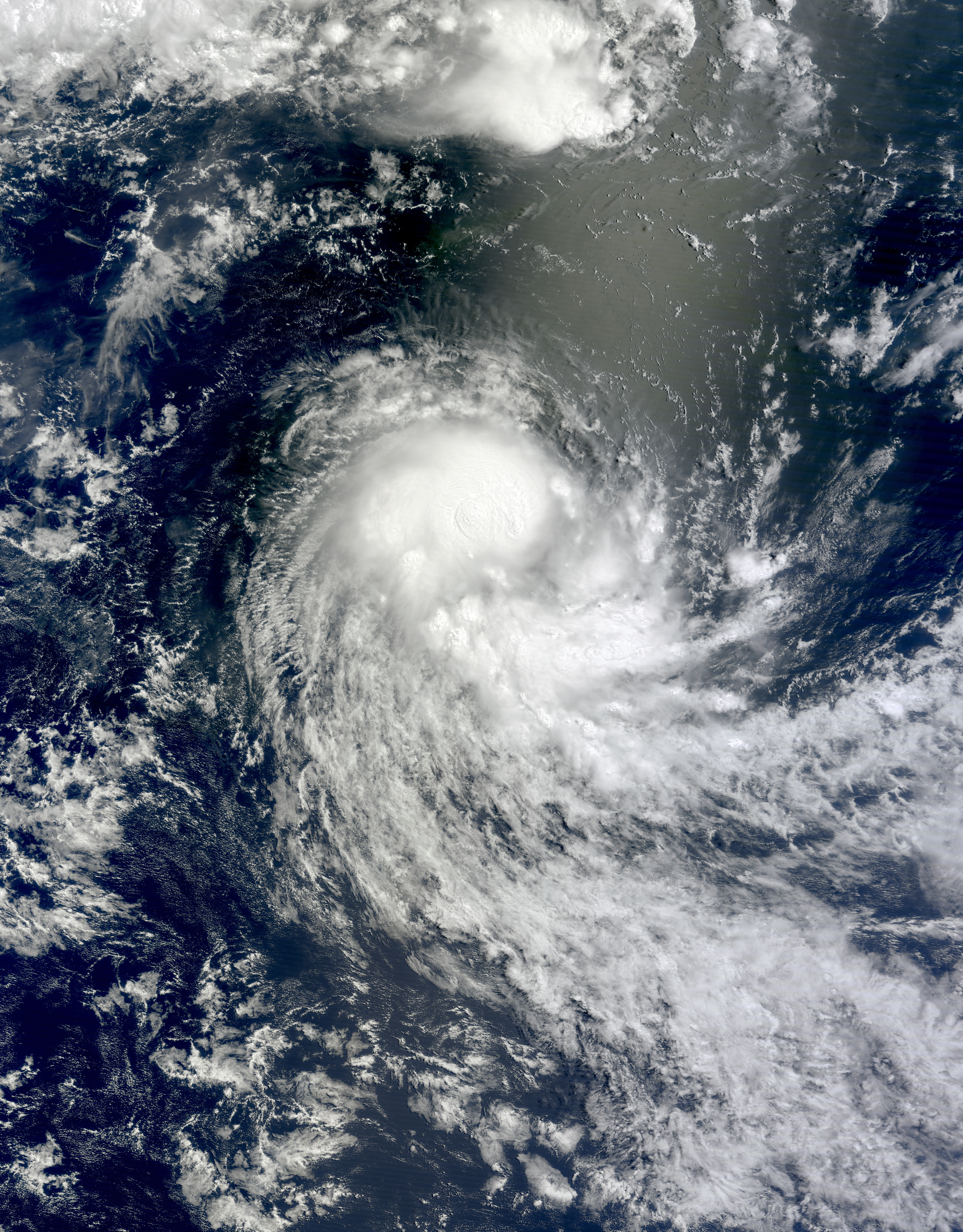
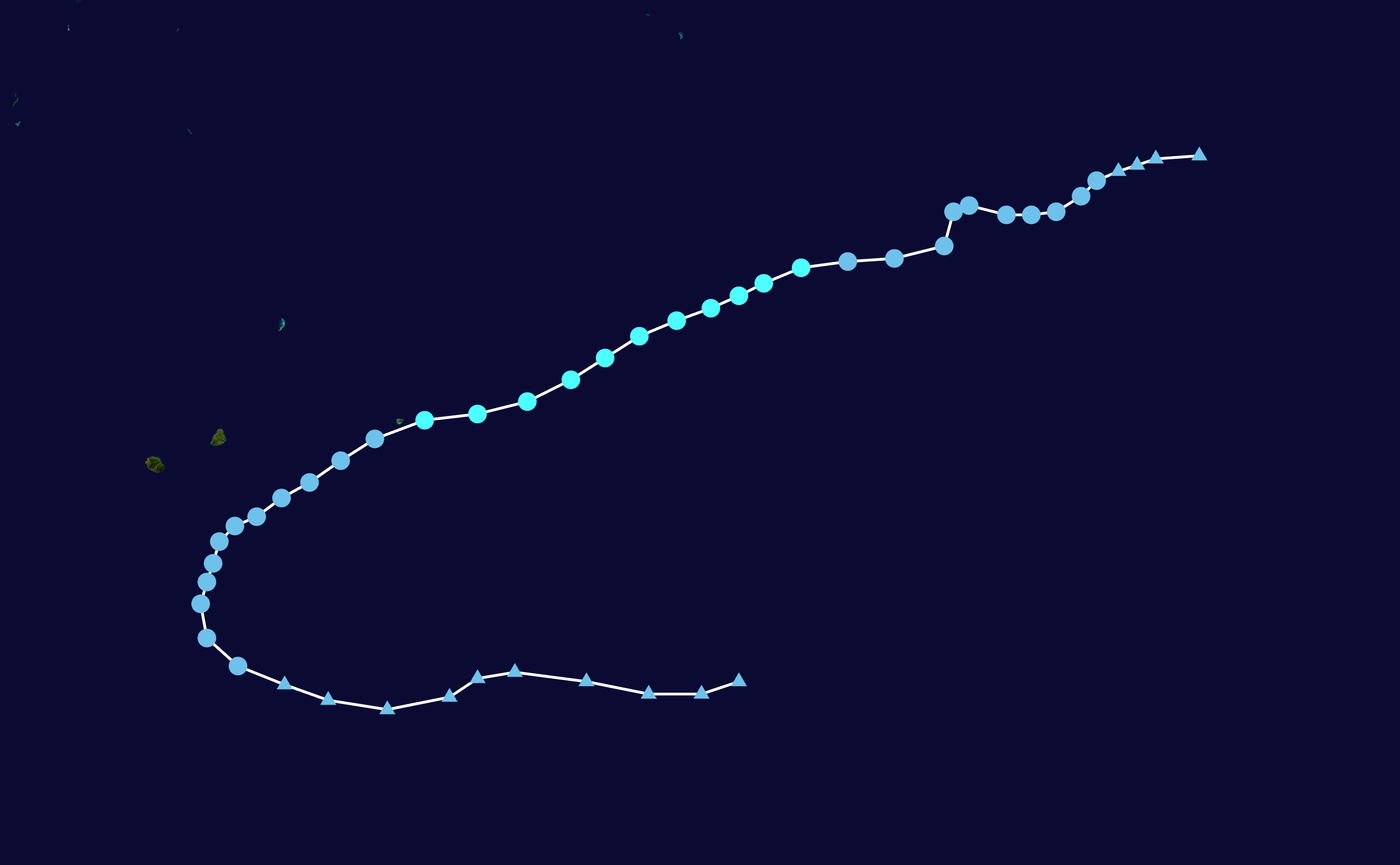
- Duration: 13 March (Entered basin) – 23 March
- Peak intensity: 75 km/h (45 mph) (10-min); 993 hPa (mbar)

On 10 March, Tropical Low 23U developed in the Australian basin southwest of Sumatra, and proceeded to move west. After crossing 90ºE, the MFR classified the system as a zone of disturbed weather late on 13 March, followed by an upgrade to Tropical Disturbance 07 on 14 March. The system had a poorly defined circulation but persistent convection, despite strong easterly wind shear. By 16 March however, the shear had relaxed, allowing the convection to organize as the circulation became better defined. Good outflow and warm waters favored further intensification. At 00:00 UTC on 17 March, the MFR upgraded the system to a tropical depression, and a few hours later, the JTWC initiated advisories on the system as Tropical Cyclone 18S about 925 km (575 mi) southeast of Diego Garcia, an island in the central Indian Ocean.

Gradually intensifying, the system moved steadily to the west-southwest, steered around the northern periphery of a ridge. Late on March 17, the MFR upgraded the depression to Moderate Tropical Storm Cherono. This marked the latest date for the third named storm of a season. On March 18, Cherono attained peak 10 minute winds of 75 km/h (45 mph) according to the MFR, and 1 minute winds of 85 km/h (55 mph) according to the JTWC. After that time, the circulation became exposed from the convection, affected by dry air in the region, as well as increased wind shear. On 19 March, the JTWC discontinued advisories, and operationally the MFR downgraded the system to a tropical depression that day, although a post-season analysis indicated Cherono remained a moderate tropical storm for two more days. At 21:00 UTC on 19 March, the storm passed about 40 km (25 mi) south of Rodrigues island, producing winds of 31 km/h (20 mph). The storm continued producing pulsing convection, increasing over the center on 20 March due to a temporary increase in wind shear. However, the shear returned and the convection weakened on 21 March due to an approaching upper-level trough, and Cherono weakened to tropical depression status. The same trough turned the storm to the south and southeast. On 23 March, the system became extratropical as it curved eastward. The low weakened further the next day, dissipating on 25 March.

=== Subtropical Depression 09 ===
- Subtropical depression (MFR)
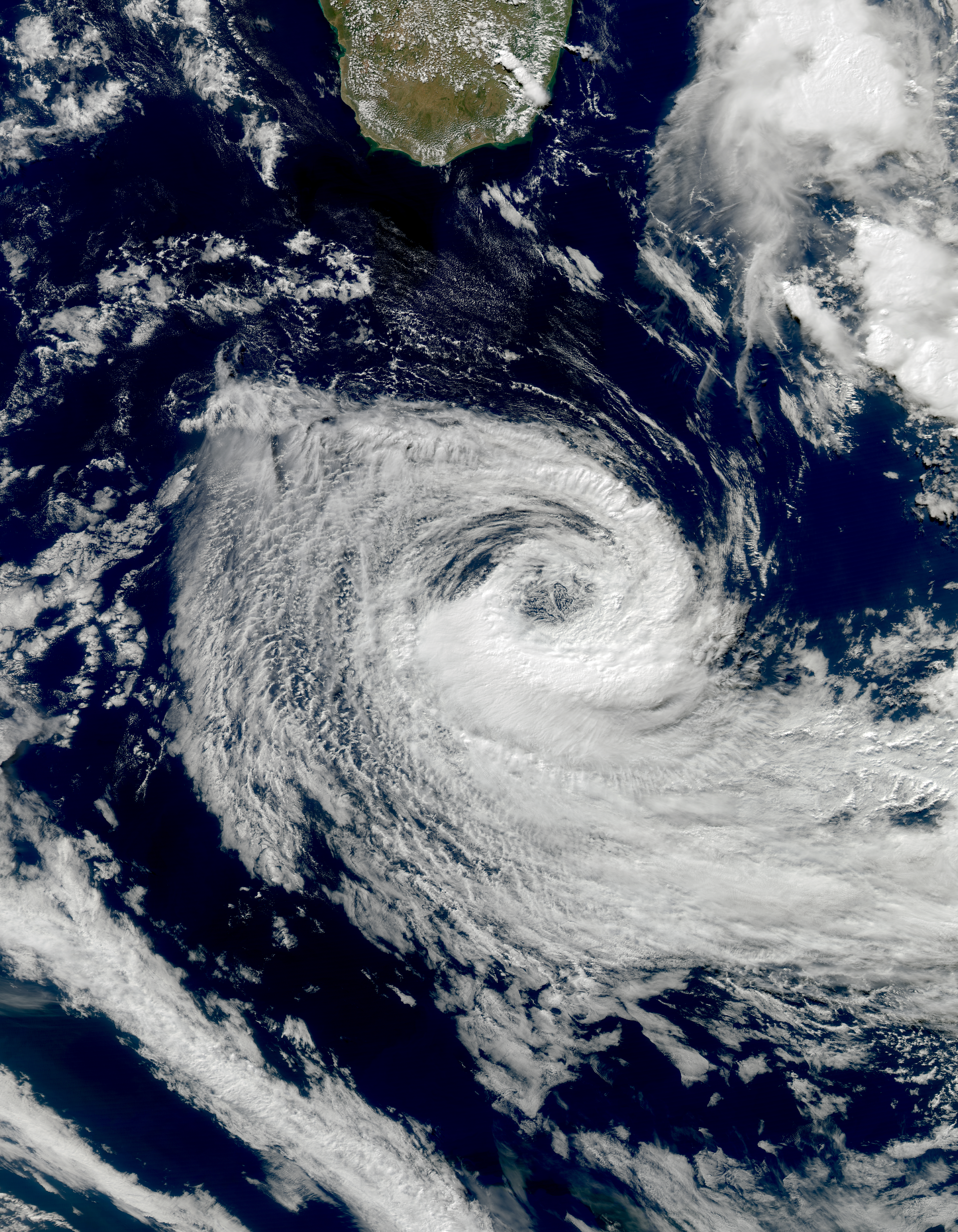
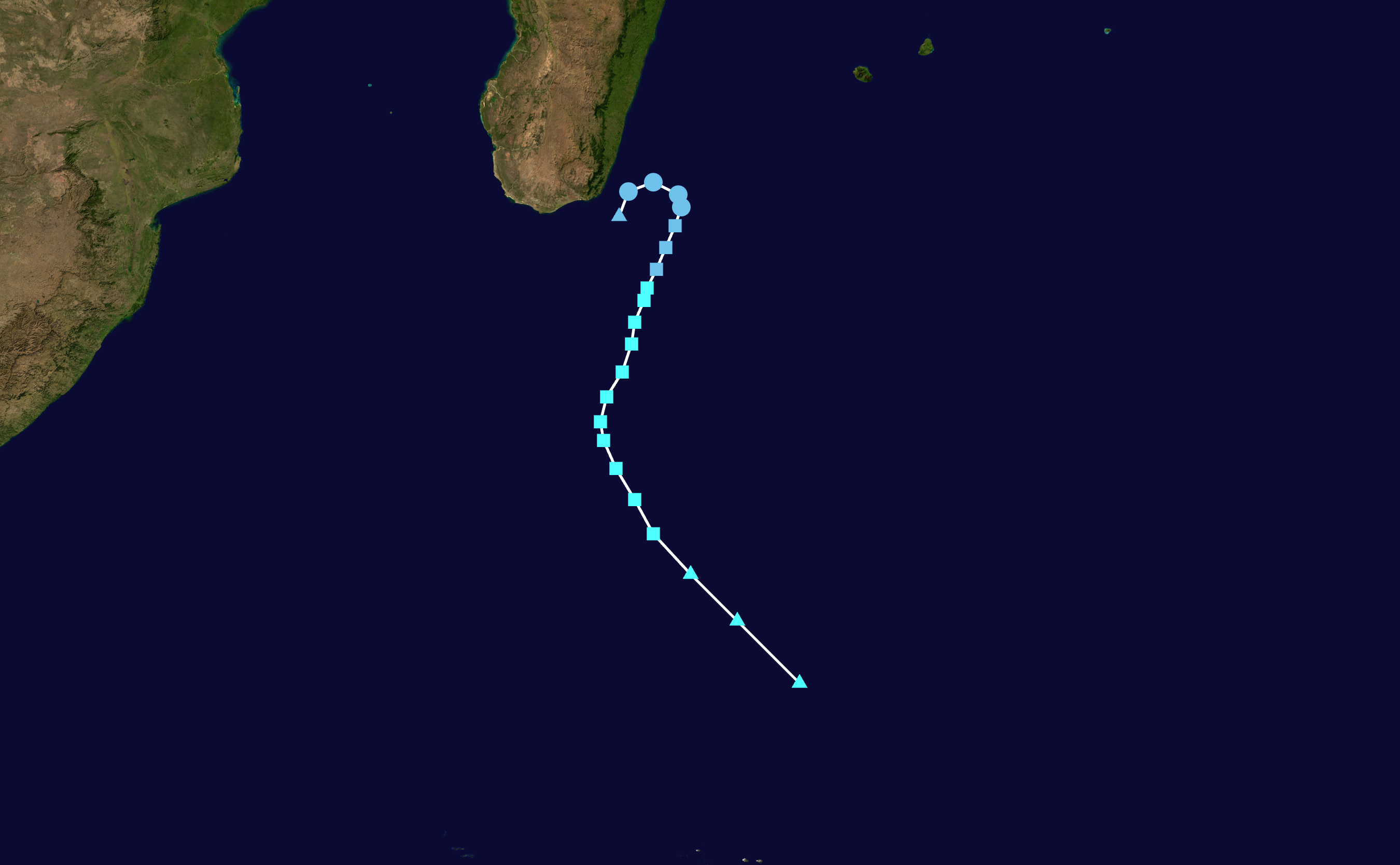
- Duration: 11 April – 16 April
- Peak intensity: 95 km/h (60 mph) (10-min); 985 hPa (mbar)

A low-pressure area moved eastward from Mozambique over open waters on 9 April. Two days later, convection increased over the center while located about 40 km (25 mi) southeast of Tôlanaro, Madagascar, which recorded a drop in atmospheric pressure. Located in a baroclinic environment, the system was located beneath an upper-level low, resulting in an unusual structure. However, warm waters and low wind shear favored development. Late on 11 April, the MFR classified the system as a zone of disturbed weather, and soon after designated it as a tropical disturbance. On 13 April, the MFR reclassified the system as Subtropical Depression 09, about 360 km (220 mi) southeast of Fort Dauphin. The system's asymmetric structure – the strongest winds were located in a convective rainband to the south of the center – resulted in the subtropical designation.

Late on 13 April, the system attained gale-force winds, although it remained an unnamed subtropical depression. The MFR later noted that the storm could have been named, but the agency decided against it due to the structure and the location. After moving clockwise, the storm began moving southwestward, steered by a ridge. The storm gradually intensified, and the convection increased around the center, although the wind field remained very large. Despite decreasing water temperatures, the storm attained peak 10 minute winds of 95 km/h (60 mph) on 15 April. That day, the system also developed a warm thermal core, similar in structure to a tropical cyclone. Increased wind shear disrupted the convection, causing the storm to transition into an extratropical cyclone on 16 April. The system turned to the southeast and was absorbed by an approaching cold front on 17 April.

=== Other systems ===
The monsoon spawned a mesoscale convective system near Réunion on 28 January, with a weak circulation forming near the south coast of the island. The system dropped heavy rainfall over the island, reaching 400 mm (16 in) in mountainous areas. The circulation moved southward away from Réunion, becoming increasingly defined. On January 30, the MFR classified the system as Tropical Disturbance 04. However, the system soon weakened after it encountered cooler waters and stronger wind shear, and the MFR discontinued advisories early on 31 January. By 2 February, the remnants of the disturbance became extratropical while accelerating to the southeast.

On 14 February, a weak low was present north of Rodrigues island with disorganized convection due to easterly wind shear. By the following day, the convection had become more persistent, accompanied by a broad circulation. At 18:00 UTC on 15 February, the MFR classified the system as Tropical Disturbance 06 to the northeast of Réunion. Continued wind shear prevented significant development, and the system moved southward, developing intermittently strong convection. On 18 February, the MFR discontinued advisories, although the remnant circulation persisted for several more days.

Toward the end of March, the ITCZ produced an increase in convection in the Australian basin, accompanied by a disorganized center. The system moved westward over an area of warm water temperatures, and after crossing 90ºE into the basin, the MFR classified it as Tropical Disturbance 08 on 29 March after the convection organized more. The circulation became better defined, and the MFR anticipated that the system would eventually intensify into a severe tropical storm. However, poor inflow and unfavorable wind shear prevented the system from organizing, and the MFR discontinued advisories on March 31 after the circulation remained exposed from the convection. The circulation persisted for a few more days before becoming poorly defined on 4 April.

== Storm names ==
Within the South-west Indian Ocean Tropical Depressions and Subtropical Depressions that are judged to have 10-minute sustained windspeeds of 65 km/h, (40 mph) by the Regional Specialized Meteorological Center on La Réunion Island, France (RSMC La Réunion) are usually assigned a name. However it is the Sub-Regional Tropical Cyclone Advisory Centers in Mauritius and Madagascar who name the systems. The Sub-Regional Tropical Cyclone Advisory Center in Mauritius names the storm should it intensify into a moderate tropical storm between 55°E and 90°E, if the storm should intensify into a moderate tropical storm between 30°E and 55°E then the Sub-Regional Tropical Cyclone Advisory Center in Madagascar assigns the appropriate name to the storm. Tropical Cyclones moving into this region from the Australian Region are renamed by the Sub-Regional Tropical Cyclone Advisory Center in Mauritius, however tropical cyclones moving into the Australian region do not get renamed. New name lists are used every year, whilst a name is normally only used once so thus no names are retired.

- Abele
- Bingiza
- Cherono
- Dalilou (unused)
- Elvire (unused)
- Francis (unused)
- Giladi (unused)
- Haingo (unused)
- Igor (unused)
- Jani (unused)
- Khabonina (unused)
- Lumbo (unused)
- Maina (unused)
- Naledi (unused)
- Onani (unused)
- Paulette (unused)
- Qiloane (unused)
- Rafael (unused)
- Stella (unused)
- Tari (unused)
- Unjaty (unused)
- Vita (unused)
- Willy (unused)
- Ximene (unused)
- Yasmine (unused)
- Zama (unused)

== Season effects ==
This table lists all of the tropical cyclones and subtropical cyclones that were monitored during the 2010–2011 South-West Indian Ocean cyclone season. Information on their intensity, duration, name, areas affected, primarily comes from RSMC La Réunion. Death and damage reports come from either press reports or the relevant national disaster management agency while the damage totals are given in 2010 or 2011 USD.

Name	Dates	Peak intensity			Areas affected	Damage (USD)	Deaths	Ref(s).
Name	Dates	Category	Wind speed	Pressure	Areas affected	Damage (USD)	Deaths	Ref(s).
01	25–29 October	Tropical Depression	55 km/h (35 mph)	997 hPa (29.44 inHg)	None	None	None	
Abele	28 November – 3 December	Tropical Cyclone	130 km/h (80 mph)	974 hPa (28.76 inHg)	None	None	None	
03	2–3 January	Tropical Depression	55 km/h (35 mph)	996 hPa (29.41 inHg)	Madagascar	None	None	
04	30–31 January	Tropical Disturbance	45 km/h (30 mph)	998 hPa (29.47 inHg)	Réunion	None	None	
Bingiza	9–17 February	Tropical Cyclone	155 km/h (95 mph)	957 hPa (28.26 inHg)	Comoros, Madagascar	Unknown	34	
06	15–18 February	Tropical Disturbance	45 km/h (30 mph)	1,000 hPa (29.53 inHg)	None	None	None	
Cherono	13–23 March	Moderate Tropical Storm	75 km/h (45 mph)	993 hPa (29.32 inHg)	Rodrigues Island	None	None	
08	29–31 March	Tropical Disturbance	45 km/h (30 mph)	1,004 hPa (29.65 inHg)	None	None	None	
09	13–16 April	Subtropical Depression	95 km/h (60 mph)	985 hPa (29.09 inHg)	None	None	None	
Season aggregates
9 systems	25 October – 16 April		155 km/h (95 mph)	957 hPa (28.26 inHg)		Unknown	34	

== See also ==
- Tropical cyclones in 2010 and 2011
- South-West Indian Ocean tropical cyclone
- List of Southern Hemisphere cyclone seasons
- Atlantic hurricane seasons: 2010, 2011
- Pacific hurricane seasons: 2010, 2011
- Pacific typhoon seasons: 2010, 2011
- North Indian Ocean cyclone seasons: 2010, 2011
- South Atlantic tropical cyclone
