= Cyclone Bingiza =

South-West Indian tropical cyclone in 2011

Tropical Cyclone Bingiza
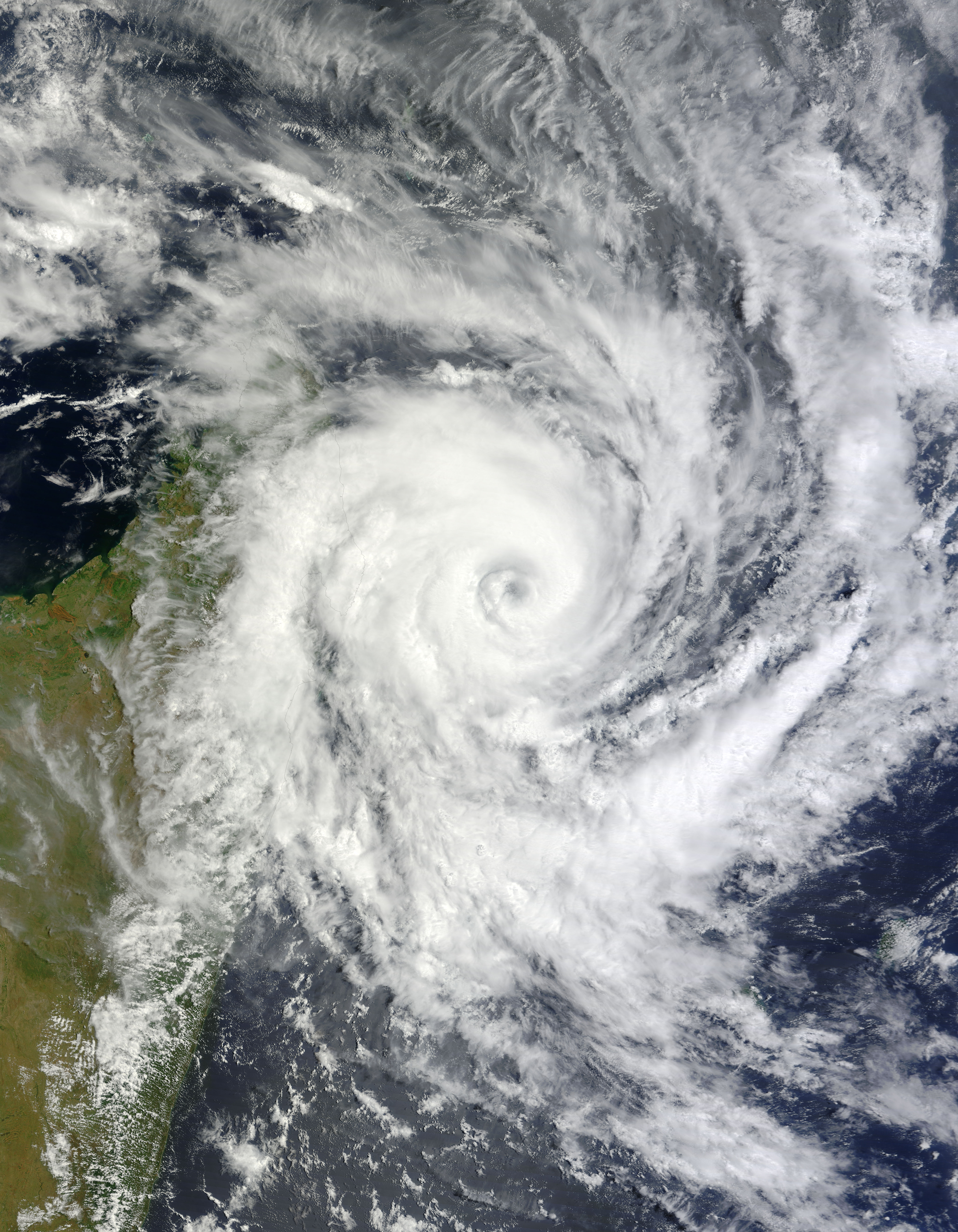
- Cyclone Bingiza approaching Madagascar on 13 February

Meteorological history
- Formed: 9 February 2011
- Extratropical: 17 February 2011
- Dissipated: 19 February 2011

Tropical cyclone
- 10-minute sustained (MFR)
- Highest winds: 155 km/h (100 mph)
- Lowest pressure: 957 hPa (mbar); 28.26 inHg

Category 3-equivalent tropical cyclone
- 1-minute sustained (SSHWS/JTWC)
- Highest winds: 185 km/h (115 mph)
- Lowest pressure: 948 hPa (mbar); 27.99 inHg

Overall effects
- Fatalities: 34 total
- Areas affected: Madagascar
- IBTrACS
- Part of the 2010–11 South-West Indian Ocean cyclone season

Tropical Cyclone Bingiza was the only named storm to make landfall in the inactive 2010–11 South-West Indian Ocean cyclone season. The second of three storms, Bingiza developed on 9 February to the northeast of Madagascar. For a few days it meandered generally southwestward, failing to intensify significantly. On 12 February, the storm began a steady westward track as environmental conditions became more favorable. In a 24‑hour period, Bingiza developed from a moderate tropical storm into an intense tropical cyclone with a well-defined eye. After attaining peak 10–minute sustained winds of 155 km/h (96 mph), the cyclone moved ashore in northeastern Madagascar on 14 February and quickly weakened as it crossed the country. Bingiza emerged into the Mozambique Channel as a weak tropical disturbance, and it turned southward to move across western Madagascar. Bingiza attained tropical storm status before making its final landfall near Morondava, degenerating into a remnant low on 17 February, and completely dissipating two days later.

Across Madagascar, the cyclone killed 34 people and injured 13 others. High winds destroyed 25,464 houses, which left 25,845 people homeless. Bingiza first affected the Masoala National Park, destroying half of a village and leaving it isolated. High winds and heavy rainfall left over 500 km^{2} (195 mi^{2}) of damaged crops, which increased food prices and threatened the economic livelihoods of the affected people.

== Meteorological history ==
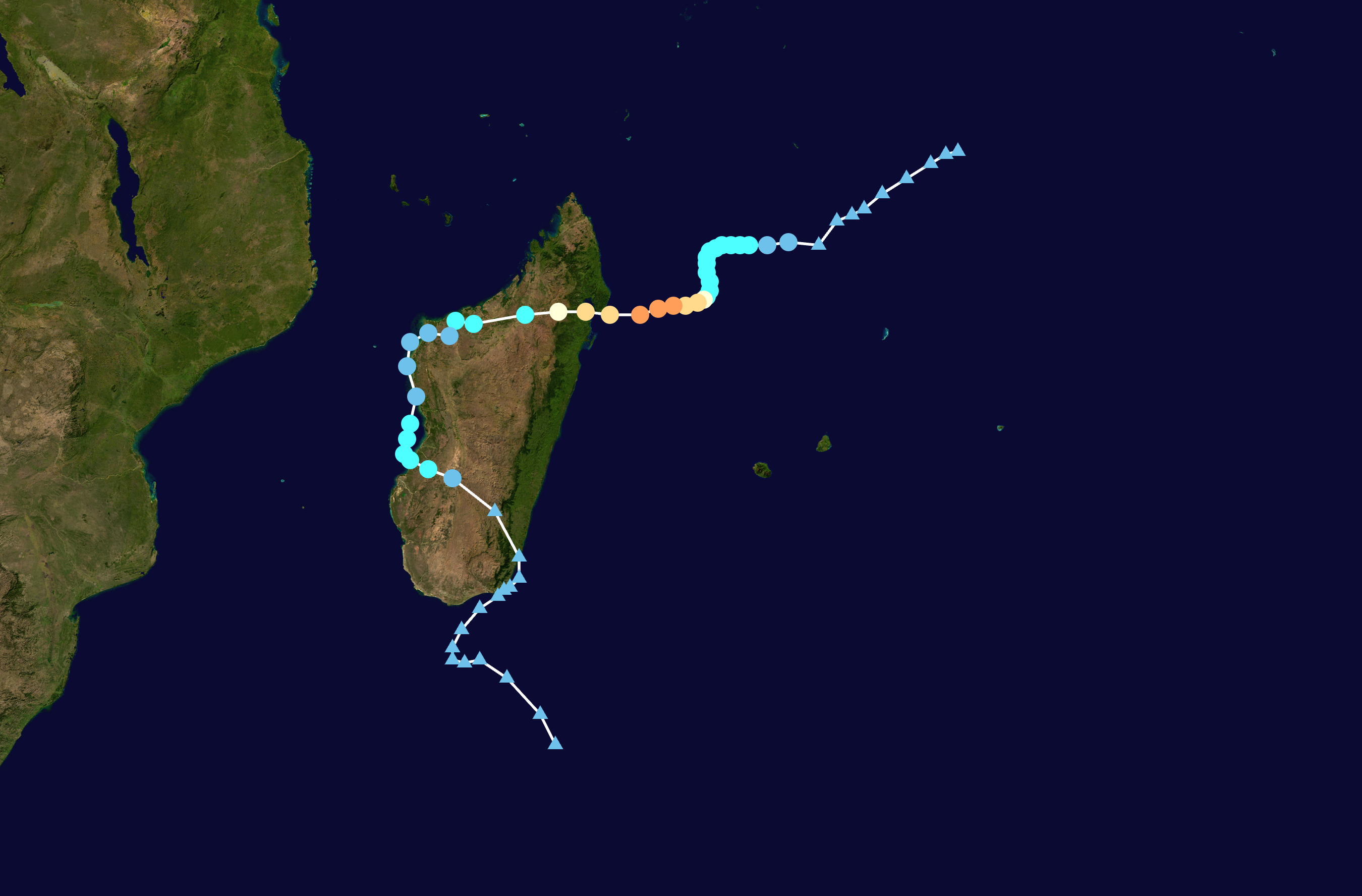
Map plotting the storm's track and intensity, according to the Saffir–Simpson scale Map key Saffir–Simpson scale Tropical depression (≤38 mph, ≤62 km/h) Tropical storm (39–73 mph, 63–118 km/h) Category 1 (74–95 mph, 119–153 km/h) Category 2 (96–110 mph, 154–177 km/h) Category 3 (111–129 mph, 178–208 km/h) Category 4 (130–156 mph, 209–251 km/h) Category 5 (≥157 mph, ≥252 km/h) Unknown Storm type Tropical cyclone Subtropical cyclone Extratropical cyclone, remnant low, tropical disturbance, or monsoon depression

The origins of Cyclone Bingiza were from a persistent area of disorganized convection on 8 February, about 880 km (550 mi) north-northeast of Réunion. At the time, the system consisted of a poorly defined circulation, located in an area of low wind shear. It moved west-southwestward along the northern periphery of a ridge, and its convection gradually became more organized over the center. On 9 February, Météo-France (MF) classified the system as Tropical Disturbance 5, and six hours later upgraded it to a tropical depression. Shortly thereafter, the Joint Typhoon Warning Center (JTWC) issued a tropical cyclone formation alert after convective banding and outflow increased. Following intensification of the depression into a moderate tropical storm, MF advised the Madagascan Weather Service to name the storm as Bingiza which they did late on February 9.

Upon becoming a tropical storm, Bingiza was located in an area of weak steering currents, which resulted in a slow, meandering motion toward the southwest. Its motion turned to the south on 10 February, with conditions only marginally favorable for further intensification. After two days of meandering without strengthening, Bingiza turned to the southwest on due to a building ridge to its southwest toward Madagascar. Around the same time, upper-level conditions began improving, which allowed the convection to increase in coverage. Based on the improved appearance, MF upgraded Bingiza to a severe tropical storm at 06:00 UTC on 12 February about 335 km (208 mi) east of the coast of Madagascar. Later that day an eye became apparent on satellite imagery, signaling the beginning of a rapid deepening trend. Late on 12 February, MF upgraded Bingiza to tropical cyclone intensity, which is the equivalent of a hurricane or typhoon. With minimal wind shear and warm waters, the agency forecast the cyclone to intensify further to peak 10–sustained winds of 195 km/h (121 mph). Continuing to strengthen, Bingiza attained 10 minute sustained winds of 155 km/h (96 mph) early on 13 February. Similarly, the JTWC estimated peak 1-minute sustained winds of 185 km/h (115 mph), noting a contracting eye 37 km (23 mi) in diameter in the process of an eyewall replacement cycle.

Despite initial forecasts, the cyclone failed to strengthen further due to interaction with Madagascar. Early on 14 February, Bingiza made landfall along the Masoala Peninsula with winds of at least 150 km/h (93 mph). It emerged into the Antongil Bay, before moving ashore north of Manambolosy. It quickly weakened over land, although it produced heavy rainfall along its northern periphery. Early on 15 February, Bingiza weakened to a tropical depression. The center became difficult to locate over land, although it emerged into the Mozambique Channel north of Besalampy as a tropical disturbance. After moving over waters, the system was able to re-intensify due to favorable water temperatures and inflow. It quickly organized into a tropical depression again, although strengthening was halted after it turned southward over western Madagascar due to a ridge to its north. It again moved into the Mozambique Channel, and Bingiza re-intensified into a tropical storm on 17 February. The storm developed a concentrated area of convection near the center, as well as a poorly defined eye. The re-intensification was short-lived after Bingiza made its final landfall just south of Morondava around 13:30 UTC on 17 February. Around that time, the storm's circulation was dissipating over land, and its remnants left the island on 19 February, dissipating soon afterward.

== Impact ==
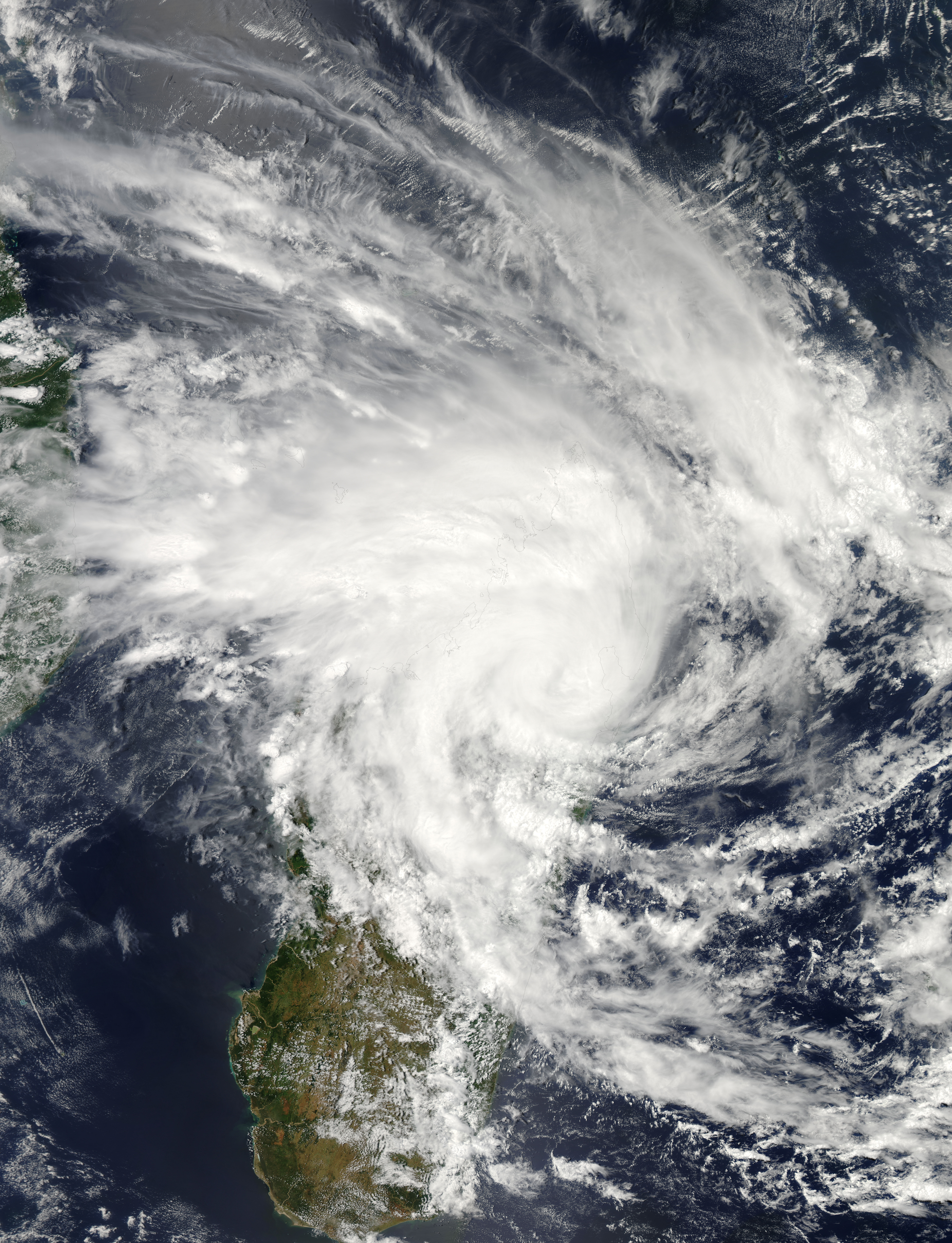
Cyclone Bingiza over Madagascar on February 14

When Bingiza made its first Madagascar landfall, it became the first cyclone to strike the country in the cyclone season. It first moved through the Masoala National Park, a sparsely populated protected region with significant numbers of trees. In Vinanivao, located along the Masoala peninsula, the cyclone destroyed half of the buildings as well as the roads and bridges, leaving it only accessible by boat. The cyclone affected five districts, primarily Mananara Nord. There, an early report indicated that 80% of the houses were destroyed, along with one hospital and four other health facilities. The high winds caused heavy crop damage, including to rice and banana, which left minimal food supplies in some areas. The vanilla crop was also severely affected, and the mayor of Mananara was uncertain whether any of the crop could be harvested. Bingiza struck at what one relief worker described as the "worst time of year for a cyclone", because many farmers were unable to replant their damaged crops. The cyclone damaged 40% of the food crops and 10% of the cash crops in Manambolosy, as well as 70% of the food crops in Antanambaobe. Overall, the cyclone destroyed 405.23 km^{2} (156.46 sq mi) of rice fields, as well as 101.67 km^{2} (39.26 sq mi) of other crops. The cyclone also damaged the road infrastructure in Mananara, which made it difficult to transport fish in the region to other areas of the country. The resulting crop and road damage resulted in increased food prices.

Across its path, Bingiza destroyed 25,464 houses and damaged 36 schools. Overall, the damage was less than expected, given the strength of the cyclone. Most of the damage occurred due to the poor infrastructure and drainage systems of Madagascar, along with high levels of poverty. A total of 34 deaths were reported, along with 13 injuries. When Bingiza made its final landfall, it produced five days of rainfall to a region already severely affected by flooding. In Vangaindrano district in southeastern Madagascar, the cyclone caused widespread flooding that isolated five villages, as well as covering fields of rice and other crops. A total of 310 people in the southern portion of the country were left homeless.

Immediately after the storm moved ashore, high winds prevented disaster teams from assessing damage in the affected areas. By 18 February, CARE international had dispatched relief teams to the most affected regions. The teams distributed plastic tarps and food for 10,000 people. High winds halted locust-control operations, while heavy rainfall provided favorable breeding conditions. In the area of the cyclone's first landfall, most people were able to rebuild their houses using trees and supplies from the surrounding countryside. Overall, about 25,845 people became homeless due to the cyclone, although most were able to return to their homes after a few days after they were repaired. In the months after the storm's passage, the European Commission allocated €200,000 ($287,000 USD) to CARE France for the storm victims.

== See also ==
- Tropical cyclones in 2011
- Cyclone Indlala (2007)
- Cyclone Ivan (2008)
- Cyclone Enawo (2017)
