= 1982–83 South-West Indian Ocean cyclone season =

Cyclone season in the Southwest Indian Ocean

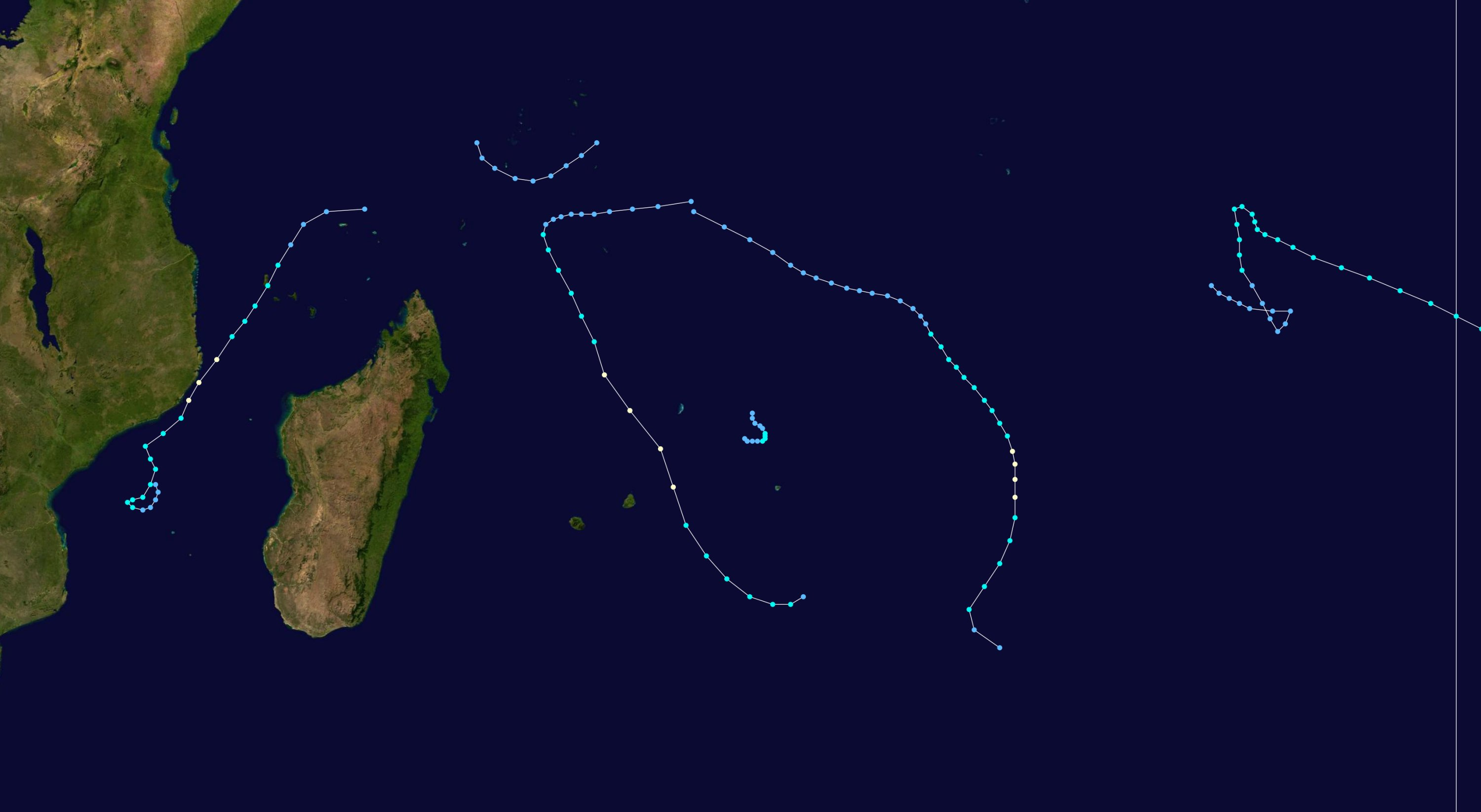
- Season summary map

Seasonal boundaries
- First system formed: 27 October 1982
- Last system dissipated: 24 June 1983

Strongest storm
- Name: Bemany and Elinah
  - Maximum winds: 115 km/h (70 mph) (10-minute sustained)
  - Lowest pressure: 966 hPa (mbar)

Seasonal statistics
- Total depressions: 6
- Total storms: 3 (record low, tied with 2010–11)
- Tropical cyclones: 0 (record low)
- Total fatalities: 33 total
- Total damage: $23 million (1983 USD)

Related articles
- 1982–83 Australian region cyclone season; 1982–83 South Pacific cyclone season

The 1982–83 South-West Indian Ocean cyclone season is tied with the 2010–2011 season as the least active cyclone season on record, characterized by only six named storms, with three of them – Arilisy, Clera, and Fely – failing to intensify beyond tropical depression status. No storms reached tropical cyclone status, according to the official warning agency for the basin, Météo-France, although the two strongest storms – Bemany and Elinah – peaked just below that intensity. The first named storm, Arilisy, formed on October 27, and dissipated without having affected land. However, the Joint Typhoon Warning Center (JTWC), which is an unofficial warning center for the basin, briefly tracked a tropical depression in July. The next storm was Bemany, which passed east of Mauritius near peak intensity in early December. Tropical Depression Clera existed briefly in the middle of September, and Tropical Storm Dadafy moved across the eastern portion of the basin in late December.

The only deadly storm of the season was Elinah, which formed on January 9 in the Mozambique Channel. It moved to the southwest and was intensifying when it struck Comoros on January 11. There, high winds and waves heavily damaged banana and coconut crops, and the storm damaged or destroyed 4,357 buildings. High waves knocked 40 people off a pier on Anjouan, killing 33 of them. Damage in Comoros totaled $23.1 million (1983 USD). Elinah intensified before brushing the coast of Mozambique, and it dissipated on January 9. Aside from a weak storm classified by the JTWC in February, there was minimal activity for several months. The final storm of the season was Tropical Depression Fely, which dropped moderate rainfall in eastern Madagascar in late June.

== Season summary ==
The season was the least active since the 1961–1962 season. It occurred during a significant El Niño event. Its inactivity was comparable to the 2010–11 season which had three named storms. There were 13 days when storms were active, the same as 2010–11, although the latter season also had a long-lasting subtropical cyclone. It is estimated that Tropical Depression Fely and two of the other storms in this season would not have been named during the 2010–11 season.

There were six storms named by the weather service in Madagascar or Mauritius, with advisories issued by Météo-France's meteorological office at Réunion (MFR). At the time, the MFR area of warning responsibility was from the coast of Africa to 80° E, and the agency primarily used the Dvorak technique to estimate the intensities of tropical cyclones. The Joint Typhoon Warning Center (JTWC), which is a joint United States Navy – United States Air Force task force that issues tropical cyclone warnings for the region, also tracked a short-lived tropical storm in February, which formed on February 5 northeast of Mauritius. The system tracked to the southeast, reaching peak winds of 65 km/h (40 mph) before dissipating on February 8 northwest of Rodrigues.

== Systems ==
=== Tropical Depression Arilisy ===
- Tropical depression (MFR)
- Tropical storm (SSHWS)
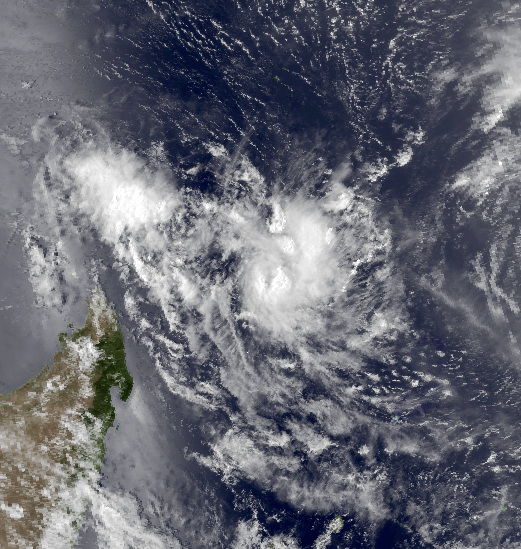
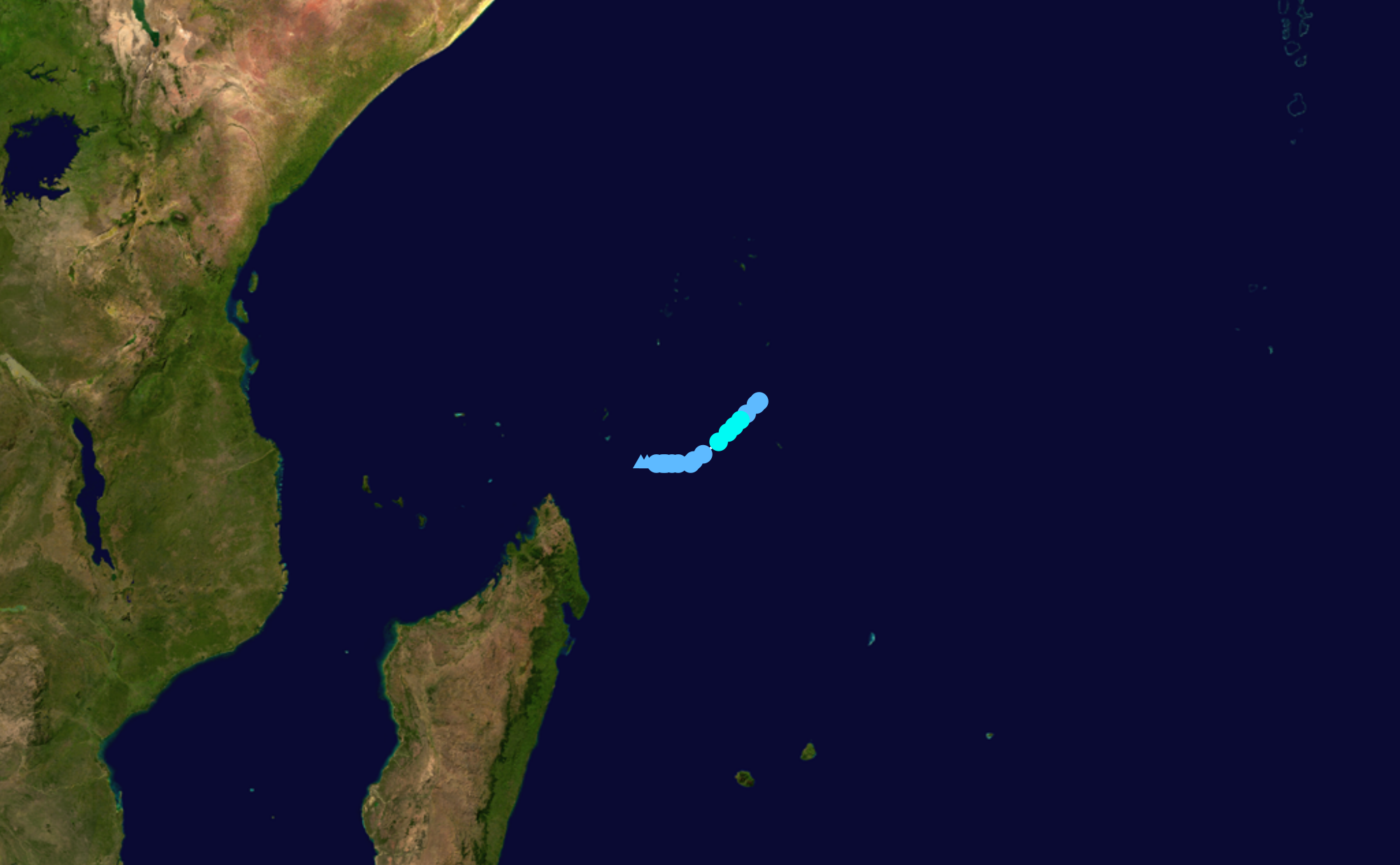
- Duration: October 27 – October 30
- Peak intensity: 50 km/h (30 mph) (10-min); 997 hPa (mbar)

A disturbance in the South Indian convergence zone near Seychelles persisted on October 24 with an area of convection. It gradually organized while passing near Agaléga. On October 27, it developed into a tropical depression, and after Dvorak classifications of 2.5, the system was named Arilisy. It became disorganized on October 29, never having intensified beyond winds of 50 km/h (30 mph). After moving to the southwest for much of its duration, Arilisy dissipated on October 30.

=== Severe Tropical Storm Bemany ===
- Severe tropical storm (MFR)
- Category 1 tropical cyclone (SSHWS)
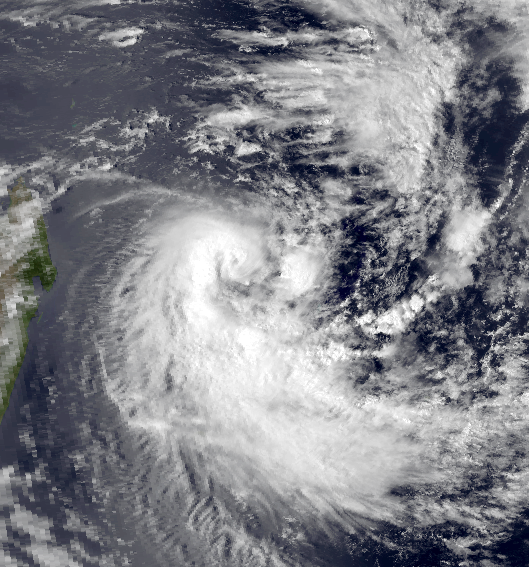
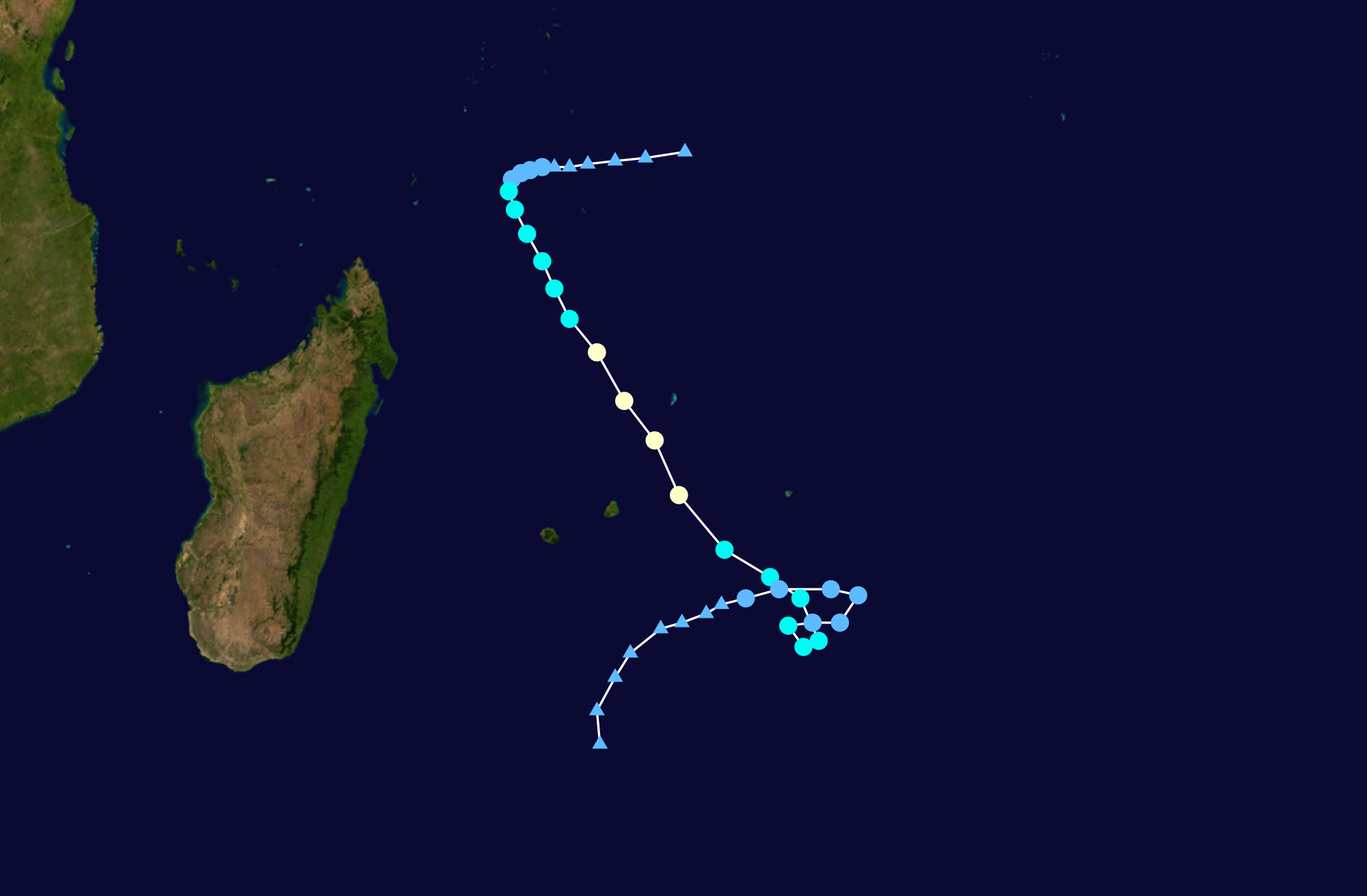
- Duration: December 1 – December 8
- Peak intensity: 115 km/h (70 mph) (10-min); 966 hPa (mbar)

On November 29, the JTWC began tracking a disturbance well to the northeast of Madagascar. On December 1, after a defined circulation developed, MFR began issuing warnings on the system. After having moved to the west-southwest, the depression turned to the southeast on December 2. Haven received the name Bemany, the storm gradually intensified; the JTWC upgraded it to the equivalent of minimal hurricane status on December 3, and the next day MFR estimated peak winds of 115 km/h (70 mph). While near peak intensity, Bemany passed about 230 km (145 mi) east of Mauritius, and it subsequently weakened. The influence of an anticyclone turned the storm to the east and caused Bemany to loop back to the west. On December 5, the storm became extratropical, and the next day the JTWC issued its last advisory. On December 7, Bemany briefly became a tropical depression again, only to become extratropical for the final time the next day; Bemany dissipated on December 9.

=== Tropical Depression Clera ===
- Tropical depression (MFR)
- Tropical storm (SSHWS)
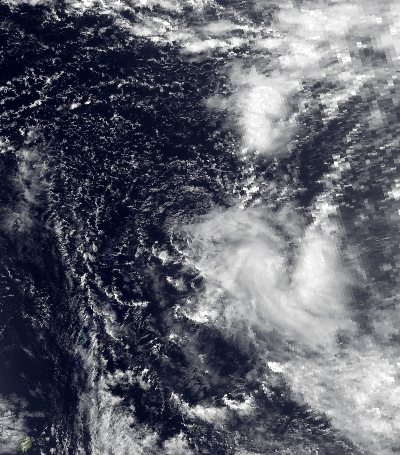
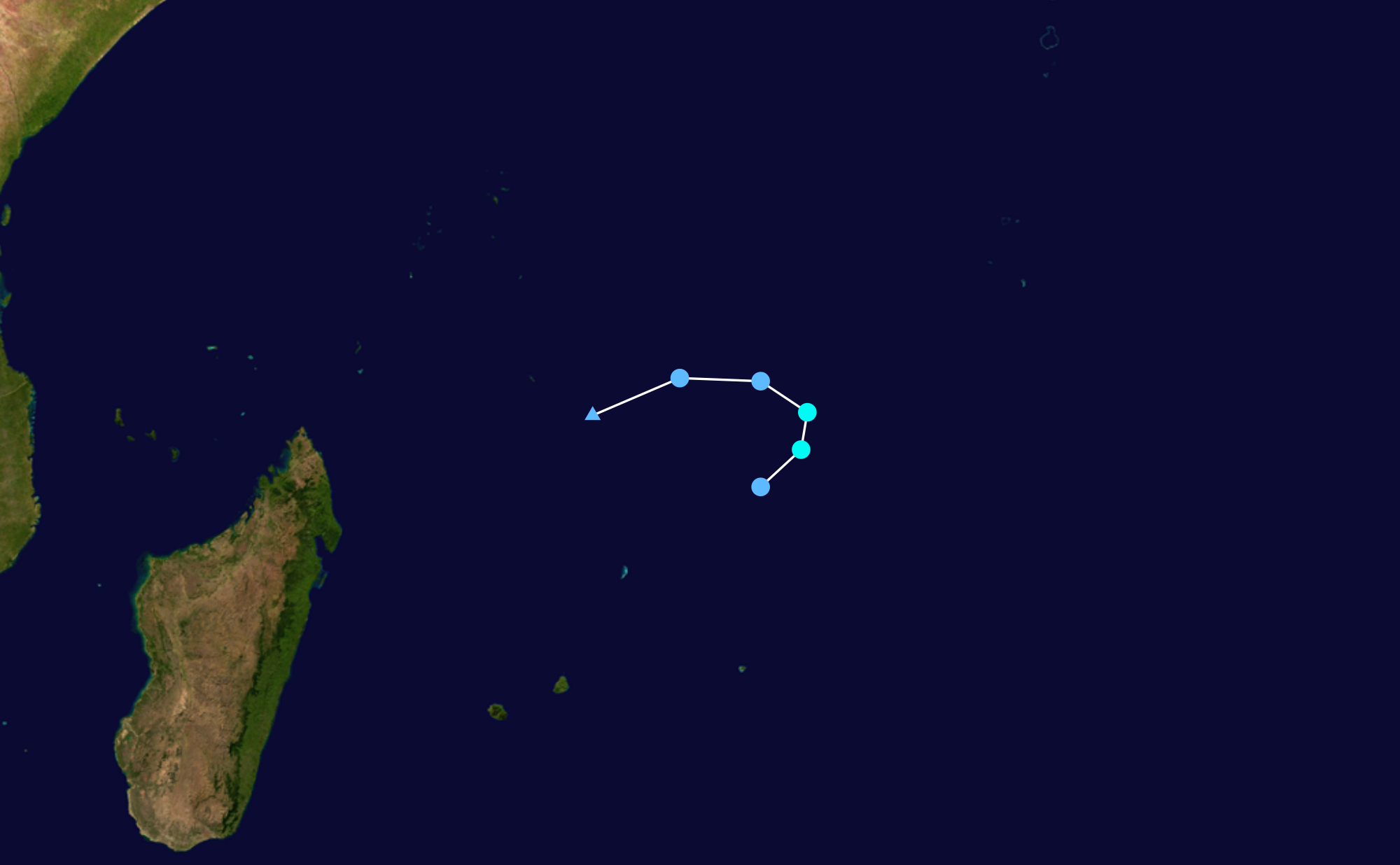
- Duration: December 19 – December 20
- Peak intensity: 50 km/h (30 mph) (10-min); 997 hPa (mbar)

On December 19, a tropical depression formed near St. Brandon. With an area of high pressure to the southeast, the depression moved to the northeast and was named Clera, after a Dvorak rating of 2.5. It only achieved winds of 50 km/h (30 mph) before weakening.

=== Severe Tropical Storm Dadafy ===
- Severe tropical storm (MFR)
- Category 1 tropical cyclone (SSHWS)
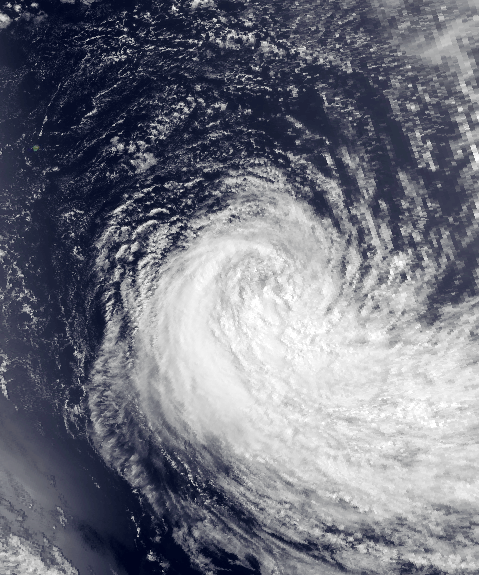
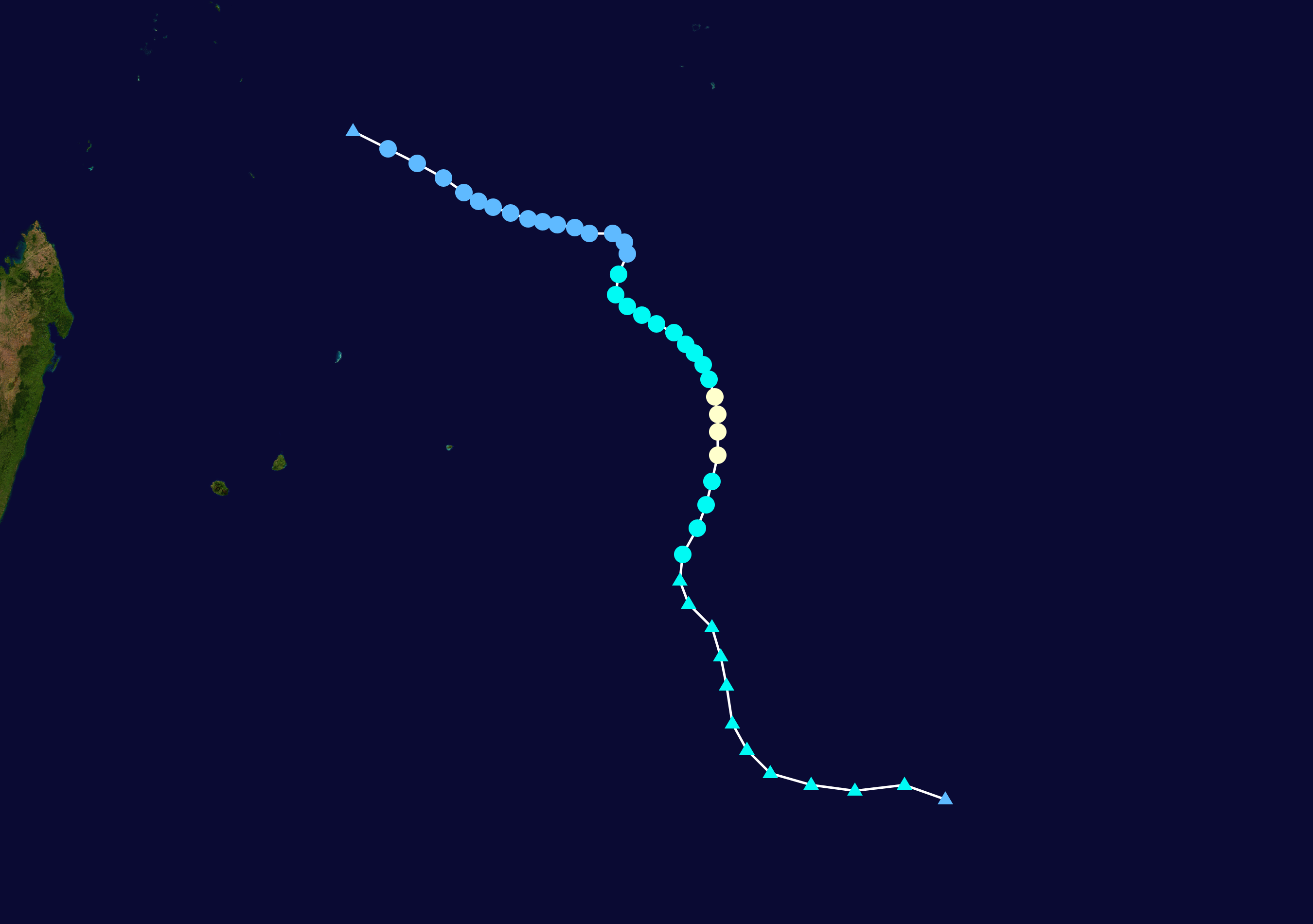
- Duration: December 24 – December 29
- Peak intensity: 95 km/h (60 mph) (10-min); 976 hPa (mbar)

The JTWC began tracking a disturbance on December 21 to the northeast of Madagascar. The system moved to the southeast and was classified by MFR on December 24. Given the name Dadafy, the storm slowly intensified, reaching peak winds of 95 km/h (60 mph) according to MFR on December 26. The next day, the JTWC estimated Dadafy strengthened to the equivalent of a minimal hurricane. The storm turned to the south and weakened. On December 29, MFR declared that Dadafy became extratropical, and JTWC discontinued advisories the next day. The extratropical remnants dissipated on January 1.

=== Severe Tropical Storm Elinah ===
- Severe tropical storm (MFR)
- Category 1 tropical cyclone (SSHWS)
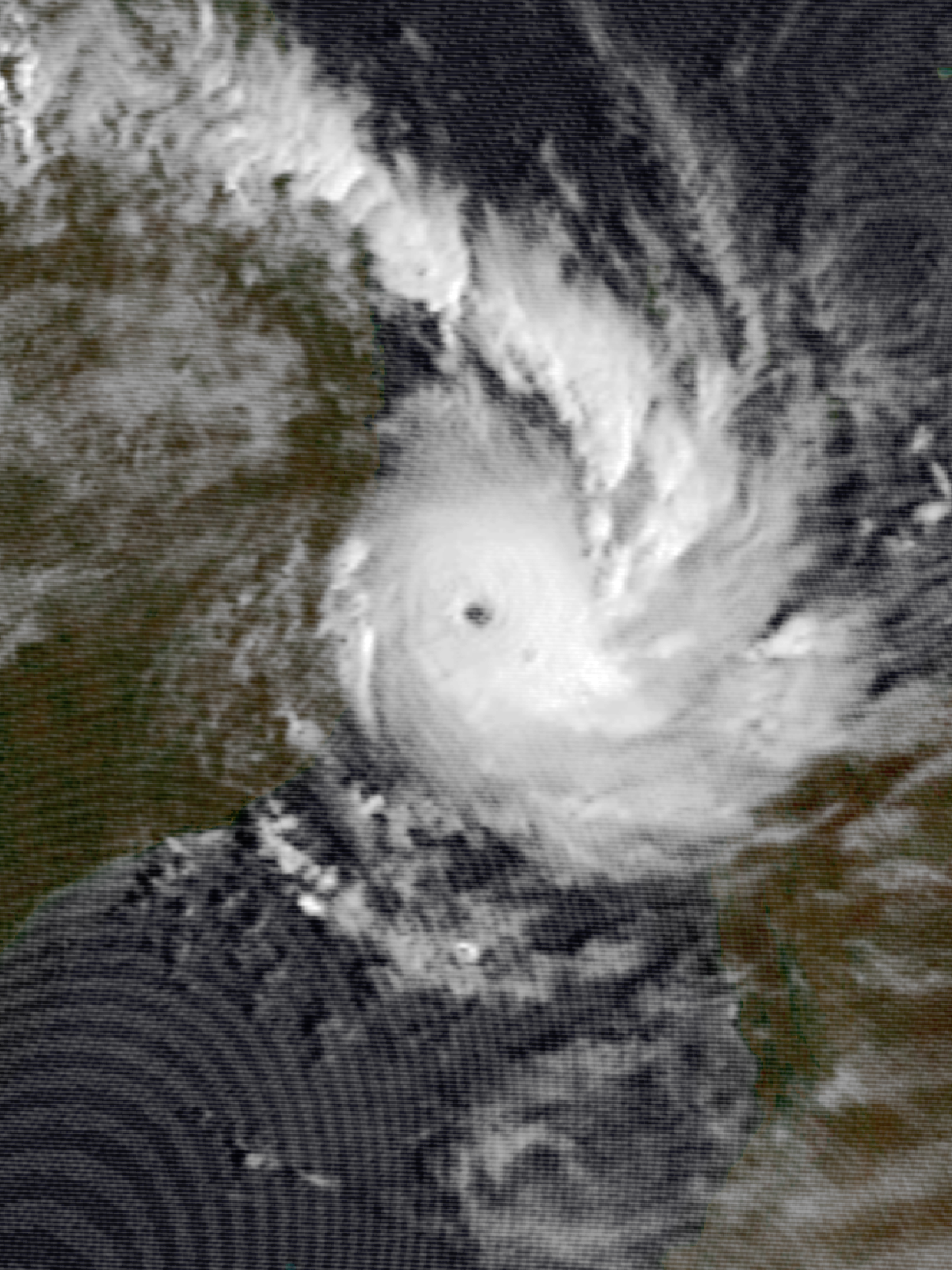
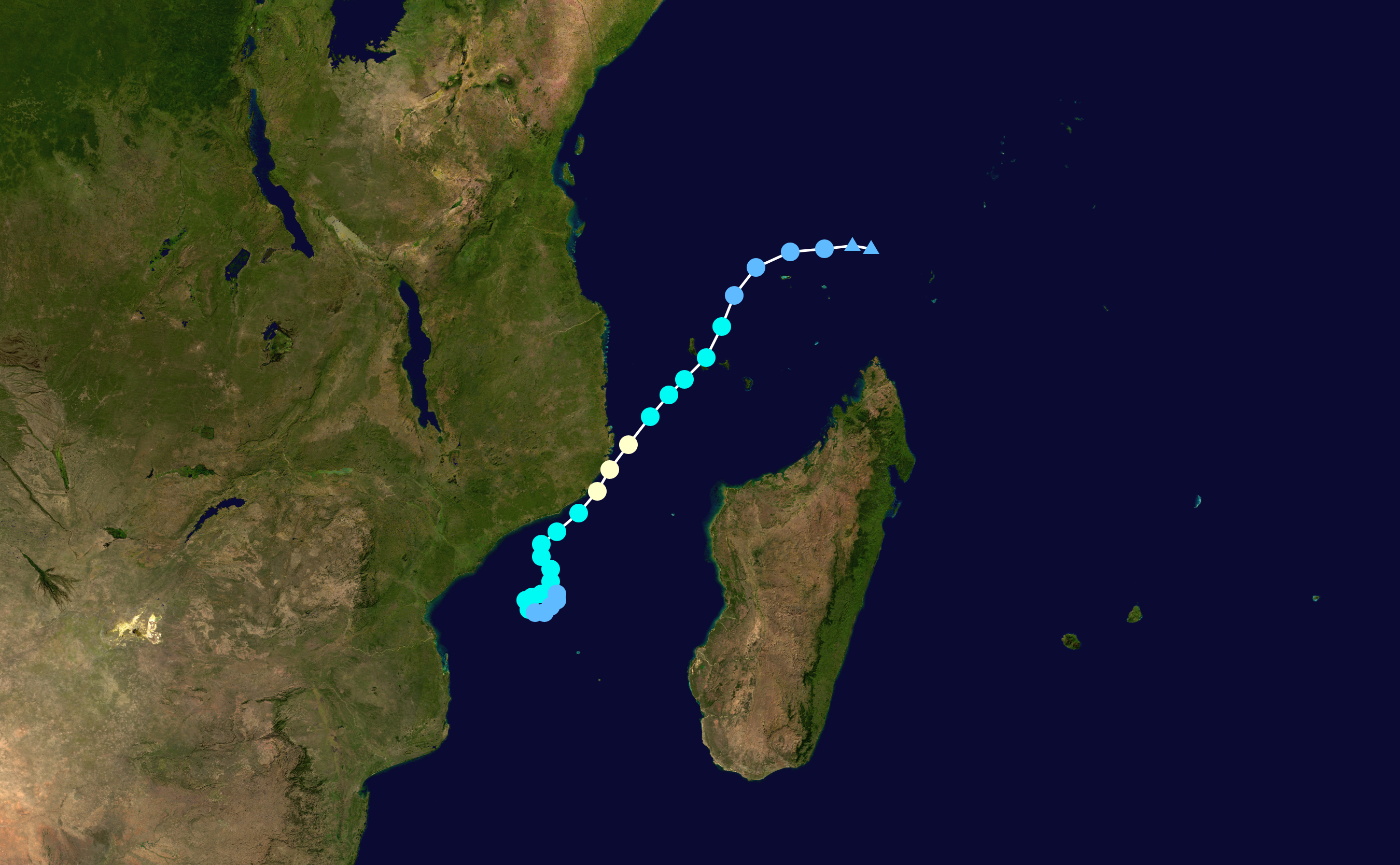
- Duration: January 9 – January 16
- Peak intensity: 115 km/h (70 mph) (10-min); 966 hPa (mbar)

The South Indian convergence zone spawned a circulation that organized into a tropical depression in the Mozambique Channel on January 9. It gradually intensified while moving to the southwest, developing spiral rainbands. On January 11, Elinah passed between Anjouan and Mohéli in the Comoros archipelago. The next day, JTWC upgraded the storm to the equivalent of a minimal hurricane, although land interaction with Mozambique weakened Elinah. After it turned to the south and moved away from the coast, the storm re-intensified, and MFR estimated Elinah reached peak winds of 115 km/h (70 mph) on January 14. Subsequently, the convergence zone caused the storm to weaken, ultimately absorbing it by January 16.

While passing through the Comoros, Elinah caused heavy damage in Anjouan and Mohéli, destroying nearly all of the banana crops and 30% of the coconut crops. About 2,400 ha (5,900 acres) of agricultural lands were flooded, and the storm damaged 2,120 ha (5,200 acres) of forests on Moheli; agriculture damage was estimated at $9.6 million (1983 USD). Elinah damaged or destroyed 4,357 buildings. High waves reaching 12 m (39 ft) damaged coastal roads and sea walls. On Anjouan, a wave knocked 40 people into the water, killing 33 of them. Elinah injured 52 and left $23.1 million in damage (1983 USD). The military of Comoros helped clear roads, and workers rebuilt the damaged buildings. After the storm passed, the government of Comoros requested for aid to the international community. Collectively, the United States, Egypt, France, Germany, and Switzerland, as well as various agencies under the United Nations, provided $1.7 million in assistance. Most of it was from the World Food Programme, which provided 2,160 tons of rice and 162 tons of vegetable oil.

=== Tropical Depression Fely ===
- Tropical depression (MFR)
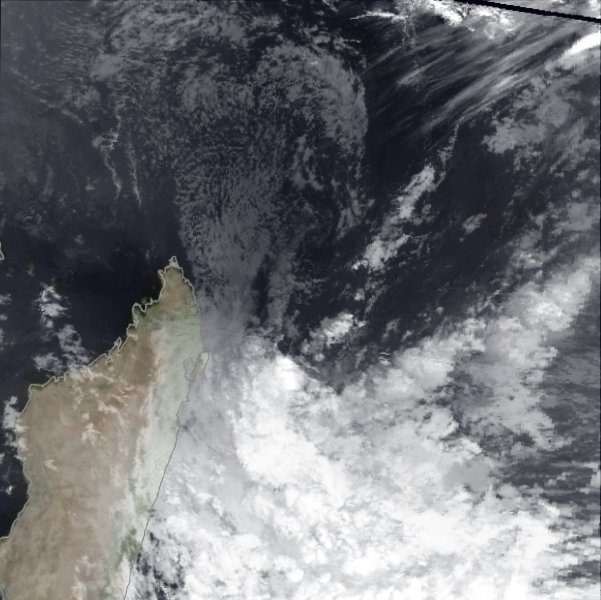
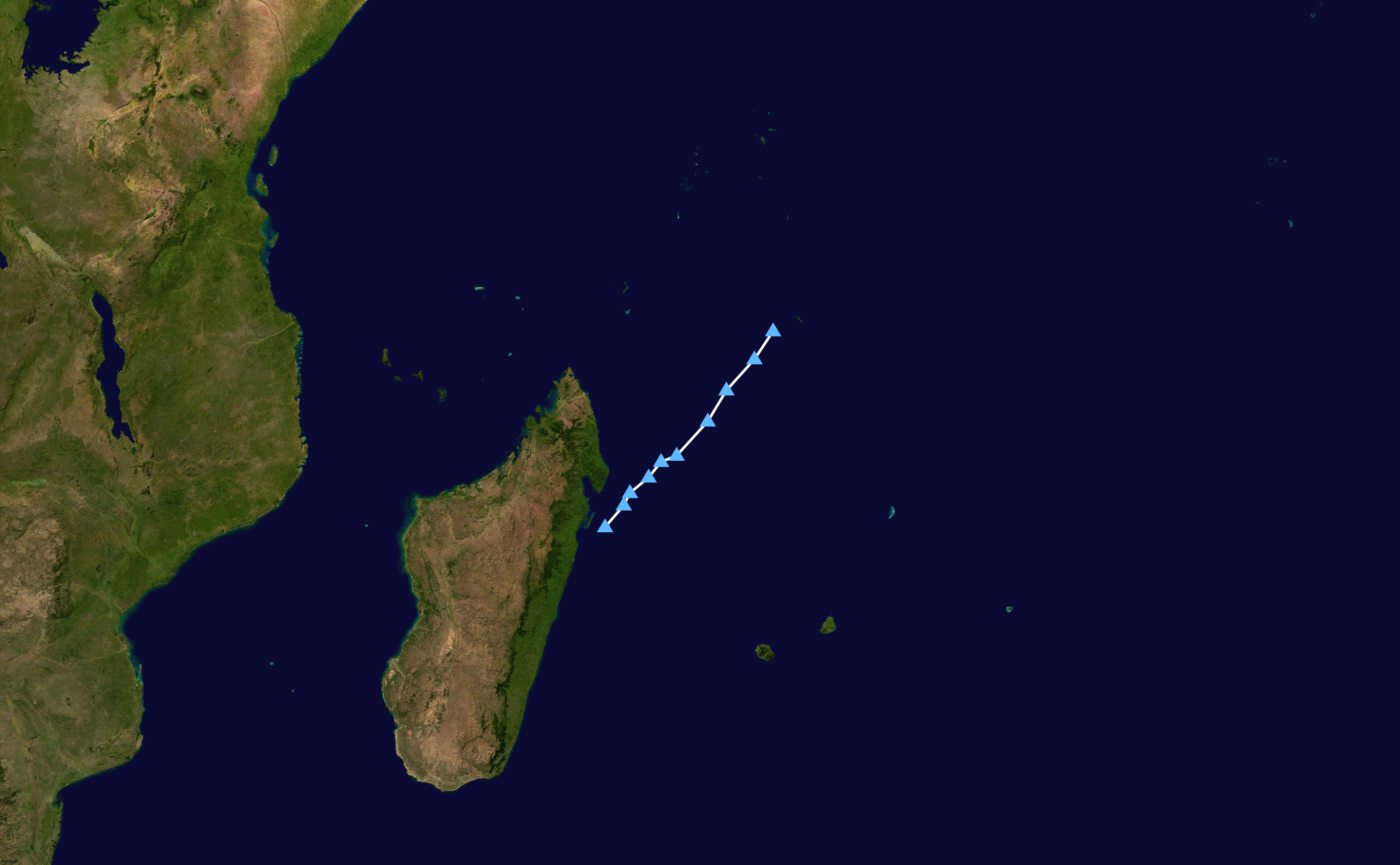
- Duration: June 22 – June 24
- Peak intensity: 35 km/h (25 mph) (10-min); 1003 hPa (mbar)

The final system of the year formed as a weak tropical depression on June 22 to the north of a powerful anticyclone. Given the name Fely, the system tracked to the southwest toward Madagascar and did not intensify. It dissipated on June 24 to the east of Île Sainte-Marie, although the remnants of Fely produced moderate rainfall. Tamatave reported 58.6 mm (2.31 in) of precipitation while the storm was approaching.

== Storm names ==
Within the South-West Indian Ocean basin, tropical systems that attain 10-minute sustained windspeeds of 65 km/h, (40 mph) are assigned a name by the Meteorological Service of Madagascar. Systems that move into this region from the Australian region are given a second name by Madagascar. New naming lists are used every year so a name is normally used only once, thus no names are retired.

- Arilisy
- Bemany
- Clera
- Dadafy
- Elinah
- Fely
- Girity (unused)
- Herizo (unused)
- Isoa (unused)
- Jailany (unused)
- Koly (unused)
- Lezoma (unused)
- Mariety (unused)
- Nary (unused)
- Ony (unused)
- Pasy (unused)
- Rondro (unused)
- Seta (unused)
- Tatamo (unused)
- Valitera (unused)
- Willetty (unused)
- Yosofa (unused)
- Zara (unused)

== See also ==
- Atlantic hurricane seasons: 1982, 1983
- Eastern Pacific hurricane seasons: 1982, 1983
- Western Pacific typhoon seasons: 1982, 1983
- North Indian Ocean cyclone seasons: 1982, 1983
