= Vinanivao =

- Location in Madagascar
- Coordinates: 15°53′S 50°16′E
- Country: Madagascar
- Region: Sava
- District: Antalaha

Population (2001)
  - Total: 14,906
- Time zone: UTC3 (EAT)

Vinanivao is a town and commune (Malagasy: kaominina) in northern Madagascar. It belongs to the district of Antalaha, which is a part of Sava Region. According to 2001 commune census the population of Vinanivao was 14,906.

Only primary schooling is available in town. The majority 75% of the population are farmers, while an additional 20% receives their livelihood from raising livestock. The most important crop is cloves, while other important products are rice and vanilla. Additionally fishing employs 5% of the population.
