= List of meteorology institutions =

The following is a list of meteorology institutions around the world.

== Governmental ==
=== Africa ===
- Egyptian Meteorological Authority
- Ghana Meteorological Agency
- Mozambique National Institute of Meteorology
- National Meteorological Office ONM (Algeria)
- South African Weather Service SAWS

=== Americas ===
- Canada
  - Environment and Climate Change Canada
    - Meteorological Service of Canada
      - Canadian Ice Service
      - Canadian Meteorological Centre
- United States:
  - National Center for Atmospheric Research NCAR
  - National Oceanic and Atmospheric Administration NOAA
    - National Severe Storms Laboratory
    - National Climatic Data Center
    - National Weather Service
    - National Centers for Environmental Prediction
    - National Hurricane Center
    - Storm Prediction Center
  - Naval Maritime Forecast Center/Joint Typhoon Warning Center
- Bermuda Weather Service
- Instituto Nacional de Meteorologia (Brazil)
- Institute of Hydrology, Meteorology and Environmental Studies (Colombia)
- Instituto Meteorológico Nacional (Costa Rica)
- Institute of Meteorology (Cuba)
- Instituto Nacional Meteorologia e Hidrologia (Ecuador)
- Instituto Nacional de Sismología, Vulcanología, Meteorología e Hidrología (Guatemala)
- Instituto Nacional De Meteorologia E Hidrologia (Venezuela)
- National Service of Meteorology and Hydrology of Peru
- Servicio Meteorológico Nacional (Argentina)
- Servicio Meteorológico Nacional (Mexico)
- Uruguayan Institute of Meteorology

=== Asia / Oceania ===
- Afghanistan Meteorological Department (Afghanistan Meteorological Authority)
- Bureau of Meteorology (Australia)
- Bangladesh Meteorological Department BMD
- Central Weather Administration (Taiwan)
- China Meteorological Administration CMA
- Hong Kong Observatory HKO
- Macao Meteorological and Geophysical Bureau
- Fiji Meteorological Service
- India Meteorological Department
- Indian Institute of Tropical Meteorology
- National Centre for Medium Range Weather Forecasting (NCMRWF), India
- Meteorology, Climatology, and Geophysical Agency (Indonesia)
- Iran Meteorological Organization
- Japan Meteorological Agency JMA
- Korea Meteorological Administration KMA
- State Hydro-Meteorological Administration (DPRK)
- Malaysian Meteorological Department MetMalaysia
- Meteorological Service of New Zealand Limited (MetService)
- National Institute of Water and Atmospheric Research (New Zealand)
- Nepal Meteorological Department (NMD) (Former: Department of Hydrology and Meteorology (DHM), Reformed 2026)
- Pakistan Meteorological Department PMD
- Palestinian Meteorology Administration (Palestinian Meteorological Department)
- Philippine Atmospheric, Geophysical and Astronomical Services Administration PAGASA
- Saudi Center for Meteorology
- Meteorological Service Singapore MSS
- Department of Meteorology (Sri Lanka)
- Thai Meteorological Department TMD
- Tonga Meteorological Service
- Tuvalu Meteorological Service
- National Center for Meteorology (United Arab Emirates)
- National Center for Hydro-Meteorological Forecasting (Vietnam)

=== Europe ===
- Administrația Națională de Meteorologie Romania
- Agency of the Republic of Slovenia for the environment Slovenia
- Croatian Meteorological and Hydrological Service
- Czech Hydrometeorological Institute
- Danish Meteorological Institute (DMI) Denmark
- Deutscher Wetterdienst (Germany) (DWD)
- Estonian Weather Service until 1. June 2013 EMHI (Estonian Meteorological and Hydrometeorogical Institute)
- Federal Service for Hydrometeorology and Environmental Monitoring of Russia
- Finnish Meteorological Institute (FMI) Finland
- Hellenic National Meteorological Service
- Hydrometeorological Institute of Montenegro
- Icelandic Meteorological Office
- Israel Meteorological Service
- Latvian Environment, Geology and Meteorology Centre
- Met Éireann Ireland
- Météo-France (MF) France
- Meteorological Service of Catalonia (SMC) Catalonia, Spain
- Norwegian Meteorological Institute (NMI) Norway
- Republic Hydrometeorological Institute of Serbia
- Royal Dutch Meteorological Institute (KNMI)
- Royal Meteorological Institute (KMI) Belgium
- Servizio Meteorologico Italy
- Instituto Português do Mar e da Atmosfera (IPMA) Portugal
- State Meteorological Agency (AEMET) Spain
- Slovak hydrometeorological institute (SHMÚ) Slovakia
- Swedish Meteorological and Hydrological Institute (SMHI) Sweden
- Turkish State Meteorological Service
- The Met Office UK
  - Hadley Centre for Climate Prediction and Research
- Ukrainian Hydrometeorological Center
- MeteoSwiss Switzerland
- Zentralanstalt für Meteorologie und Geodynamik Austria

== Multinational ==
- Caribbean Institute for Meteorology and Hydrology (CIMH)
- EGOWS
- EUMETNET
- European Centre for Medium-Range Weather Forecasts (ECMWF)
- European Organisation for the Exploitation of Meteorological Satellites (EUMETSAT)
- Global Atmosphere Watch
- World Meteorological Organization (WMO)

== Non-governmental organizations ==
- American Geophysical Union
- American Meteorological Society
- Association of Certified Meteorologists
- Australian Meteorological and Oceanographic Society
- Canadian Meteorological and Oceanographic Society
- European Geosciences Union
- European Meteorological Society
- European Storm Forecast Experiment
- Indian Meteorological Society
- International Association of Meteorology and Atmospheric Sciences
- International Society of Biometeorology
- Meteorological Society of New Zealand
- National Weather Association
- Royal Meteorological Society
- Meteorological Society of Japan

== Education and Research ==
- Cooperative Institute for Severe and High-Impact Weather Research and Operations
- European Severe Storms Laboratory
- Max Planck Institute for Meteorology
- McGill Atmospheric and Oceanic Sciences
- Meteorological College (at the Japan Meteorological Agency)
- University of Miami (Florida)
- University of Oklahoma College of Atmospheric and Geographic Sciences
- Penn State College of Earth and Mineral Sciences
- Texas A&M College of Geosciences
- University Corporation for Atmospheric Research
- VAMOS Ocean-Cloud-Atmosphere-Land Study
- World Weather Attribution

== Meteorological companies ==
- AccuWeather
- DTN
- Foreca
- Meteoblue
- The Weather Company
- Tomorrow.io
- Vaisala
- Weathernews Inc.
- Windy (weather service)
- Wfy24 (weather service)
