= Ksar Chellala District =

- District

- Location within Algeria
- Coordinates: 35.2167°N 2.3167°E
- Country: Algeria
- Province: Ksar Chellala Province
- Time zone: UTC+1 (CET)

Ksar Chellala District is a district of Ksar Chellala Province, Algeria.

The district is further divided into 3 municipalities:

- Ksar Chellala
- Serghine
- Zmalet El Emir Abdelkader
