= National Meteorological Office =

- االديوان الوطني للأحوال الجوية

Agency overview
- Formed: April 25, 1975
- Headquarters: Dar El Beïda, Algiers; 36°43′02″N 3°12′20″E
- Agency executive: Director
- Parent department: Ministry of Transport
- Website: www.meteo.dz

The National Meteorological Office (ONM), also known as Météo Algérie (Arabic: الديوان الوطني للأرصاد الجوية, lit. 'Ad-Dīwān al-Waṭanī lil-Arṣād al-Jawwīyah', French: Office national de la météorologie) is the institution responsible for meteorological monitoring in Algeria. It is part of the World Meteorological Organization (WMO) and operates under the authority of the Algerian Ministry of Transport.

== Creation ==
The origins of the National Meteorological Office (ONM) date back to Algeria's ratification of the World Meteorological Organization's convention on April 4, 1963.

The ONM was established by decree no. 75–25 on April 29, 1975. It became a public industrial and commercial institution (EPIC) with a scientific and technical mission through decree no. 98–258 on August 25, 1998. The office was derived from the National Establishment for Meteorological and Aeronautical Exploitation (ENEMA).

== Missions ==
The mission of the ONM is to collect meteorological data across Algeria and provide short and long-term weather forecasts. It disseminates this information to the general public and specialized users, such as aviation and agriculture, as well as issuing warnings for hazardous conditions. The ONM participates in various international organizations in this field, including the WMO.

== Organization ==
The ONM employs over 1,000 people, including 65% meteorologists and technicians. It is funded through two main sources: the sale of meteorological forecasts to businesses and media, as well as subsidies from the Ministry of Transport. Approximately 85% of the revenues come from aviation forecasts, and the remaining 15% from specialized services or public subsidies.

These funds are used to maintain a network of 82 staffed weather stations across 6 regional directions: Algiers, Oran, Constantine, Ouargla, Béchar, and Tamanrasset. The service also includes three technical stations in Ksar Chellala, Tiaret, and Assekrem for greenhouse gas observation, which are part of 28 global stations. Additionally, there are over 300 climatological posts, with over half of them being automatic, and a few weather radars to locate precipitation over Algeria's vast territory. Operating these facilities is vital for the safety of the population and the economy.

== See also ==
- List of meteorology institutions
