= Cyclone Elita =

South-West Indian Ocean cyclone in 2004

Tropical Cyclone Elita
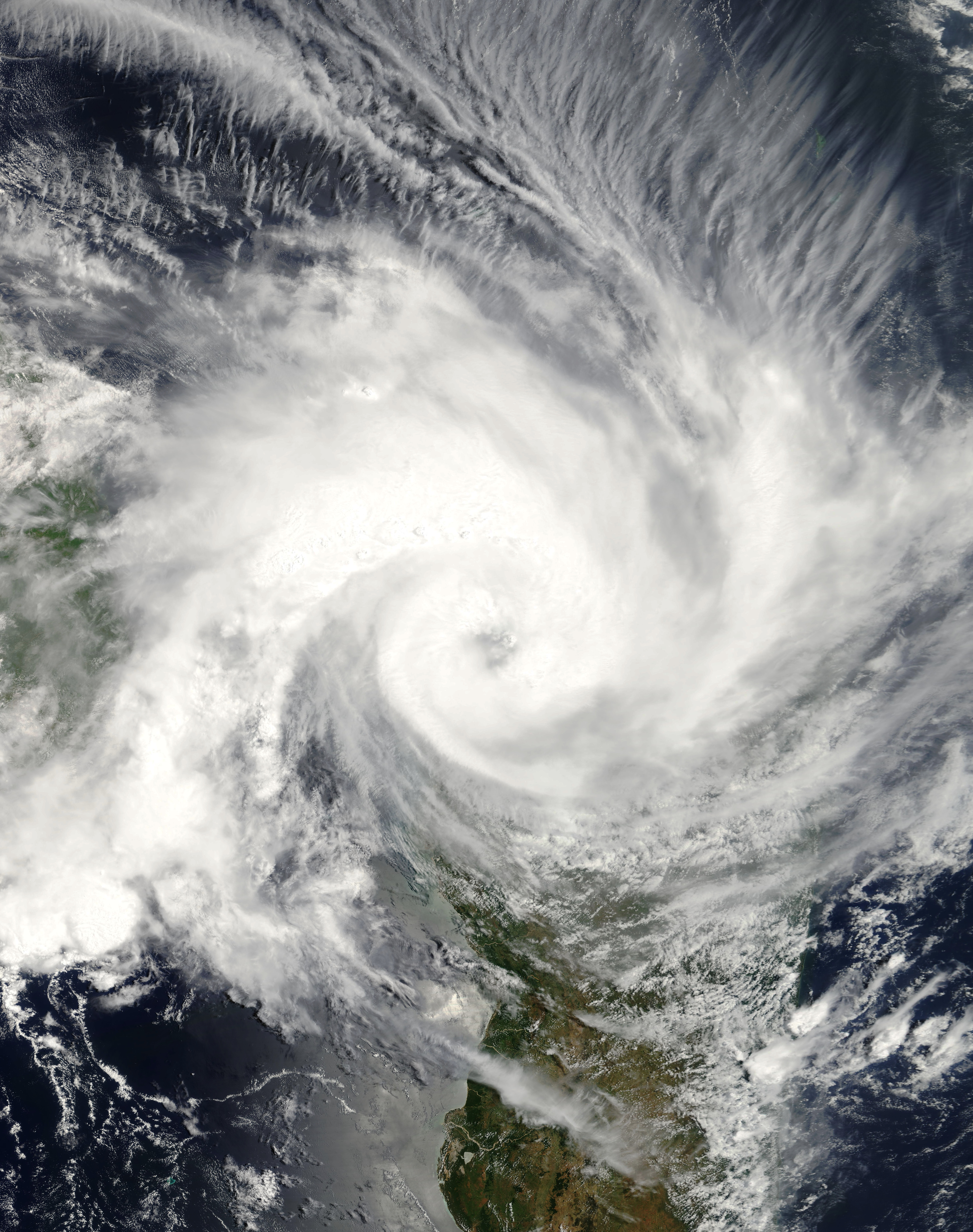
- Cyclone Elita on January 28

Meteorological history
- Formed: January 26, 2004
- Extratropical: February 5
- Dissipated: February 13, 2004

Tropical cyclone
- 10-minute sustained (MFR)
- Highest winds: 120 km/h (75 mph)
- Highest gusts: 175 km/h (110 mph)
- Lowest pressure: 970 hPa (mbar); 28.64 inHg

Category 1-equivalent tropical cyclone
- 1-minute sustained (SSHWS/JTWC)
- Highest winds: 120 km/h (75 mph)
- Lowest pressure: 976 hPa (mbar); 28.82 inHg

Overall effects
- Fatalities: 33 direct
- Areas affected: Madagascar, Mozambique, Malawi, Seychelles, Mauritius, Réunion
- IBTrACS
- Part of the 2003–04 South-West Indian Ocean cyclone season

Tropical Cyclone Elita was an unusual tropical cyclone that made landfall on Madagascar three times. The fifth named storm of the 2003–04 South-West Indian Ocean cyclone season, Elita developed in the Mozambique Channel on January 24, 2004. It strengthened to tropical cyclone status before striking northwestern Madagascar on January 28; it was the first storm to strike western Madagascar at that intensity since Cyclone Cynthia in 1991. Elita weakened to tropical depression status while crossing the island, and after exiting into the southwest Indian Ocean, it turned to the west and moved ashore in eastern Madagascar on January 31. After once again crossing the island, the cyclone reached the Mozambique Channel and re-intensified. Elita turned to the southeast to make its final landfall on February 3 along southwestern Madagascar. Two days later, it underwent an extratropical transition; subsequently, the remnant system moved erratically before dissipating on February 13.

Elita dropped heavy rainfall of more than 200 mm (8 inches), which damaged or destroyed thousands of houses in Madagascar. Over 50,000 people were left homeless, primarily in Mahajanga and Toliara provinces. Flooding from the storm ruined more than 450 km^{2} (170 sq mi) of agricultural land, including important crops for food. Across the island, the cyclone caused 33 deaths, with its impact further compounded by Cyclone Gafilo about two months later. Elsewhere, Elita brought rainfall and damage to Mozambique and Malawi, and its outer wind circulation produced rough seas and strong gusts in Seychelles, Mauritius, and Réunion.

== Meteorological history ==
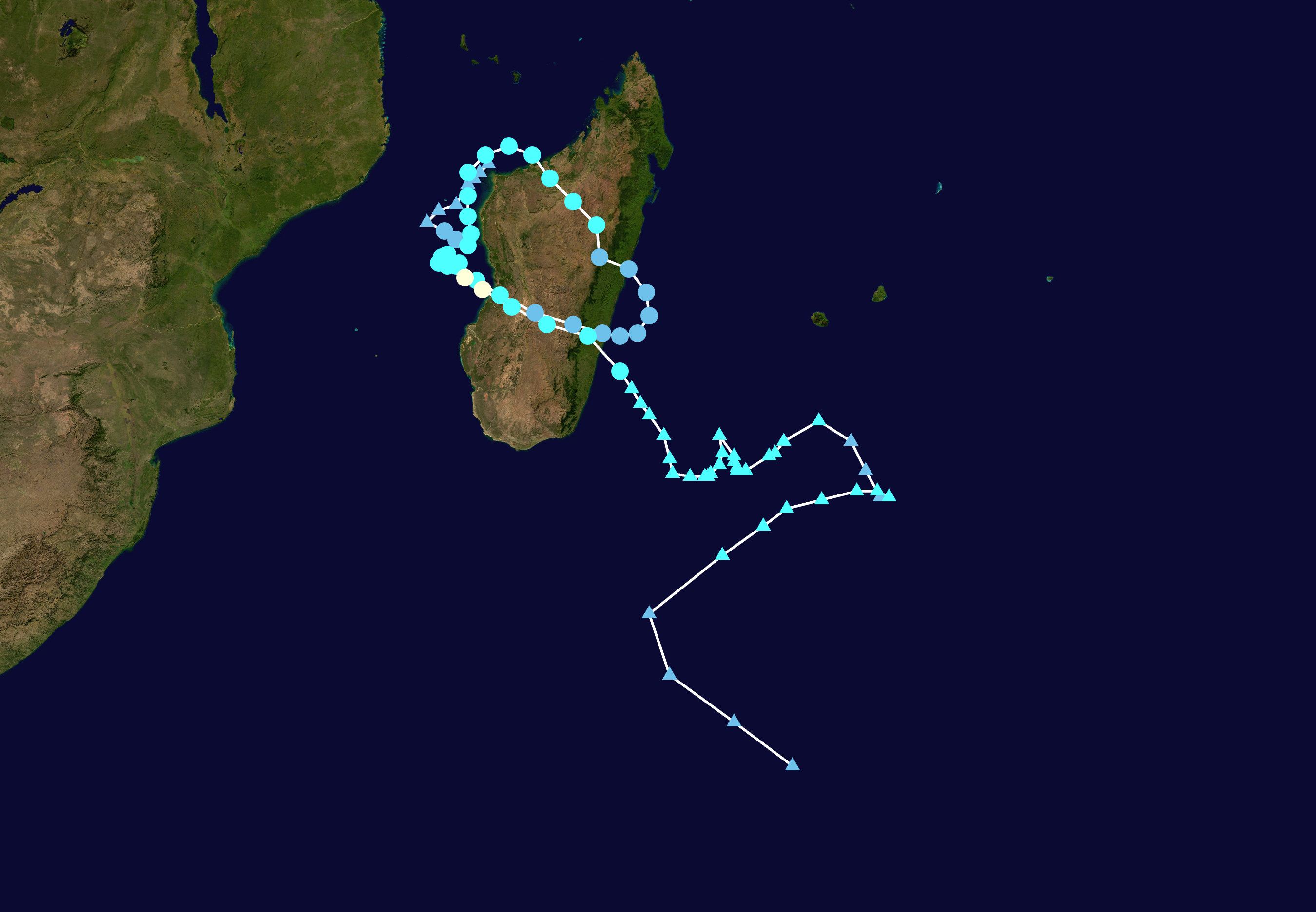
Map plotting the storm's track and intensity, according to the Saffir–Simpson scale Map key Saffir–Simpson scale Tropical depression (≤38 mph, ≤62 km/h) Tropical storm (39–73 mph, 63–118 km/h) Category 1 (74–95 mph, 119–153 km/h) Category 2 (96–110 mph, 154–177 km/h) Category 3 (111–129 mph, 178–208 km/h) Category 4 (130–156 mph, 209–251 km/h) Category 5 (≥157 mph, ≥252 km/h) Unknown Storm type Tropical cyclone Subtropical cyclone Extratropical cyclone, remnant low, tropical disturbance, or monsoon depression

Toward the end of January 2004, an active phase of the Madden–Julian oscillation exited the east coast of Africa and fueled convection (thunderstorms) near Madagascar, beginning on January 20. This pulse, the strongest of the season, was also responsible for generating cyclones Frank and Linda. The thunderstorms coalesced in the Mozambique Channel between Madagascar and Mozambique on January 24, fueled by a surge in the monsoon. That day, the Météo-France meteorological office in Réunion (Note: Météo-France's meteorological office in Réunion (MFR) is the official Regional Specialized Meteorological Center for the South-West Indian Ocean, tracking all tropical cyclones from the east coast of Africa to 90° E.) designated the system as Tropical Disturbance 06. The surge also increased wind shear in the region, which displaced the convection from the circulation. Drifting southwestward at first, the system became more defined, culminating with a marked increase in thunderstorms on January 26. That day, the MFR upgraded the system to Moderate Tropical Storm Elita near Juan de Nova Island. On the same day, the Joint Typhoon Warning Center (JTWC) (Note: The Joint Typhoon Warning Center (JTWC) is a joint United States Navy – United States Air Force task force that issues advisories for storms in the basin.) initiated advisories on the system, designating it Tropical Cyclone 09S.

Steered by a ridge to the west, the nascent Tropical Storm Elita turned northward over its previous path, an unusual trajectory for the Mozambique Channel. The convection fluctuated until January 28, when a curved rainband developed and quickly organized into an eyewall; this followed a decrease in wind shear. Another ridge to the northeast blocked the northward movement, and Elita turned to the east-southeast toward the west coast of Madagascar. Around 15:00 UTC on January 28, the storm made landfall at Bombetoka Bay, or about 30 km (20 mi) southwest of Mahajanga. The airport there recorded 10 minute sustained winds of 126 km/h (78 mph), and on that basis, the MFR upgraded Elita to tropical cyclone status in post-season analysis. This made Elita the first tropical cyclone to strike western Madagascar since Cyclone Cynthia in 1991. While Elita was active, both the JTWC and the MFR estimated an intensity of 110 km/h (70 mph) at the first landfall.

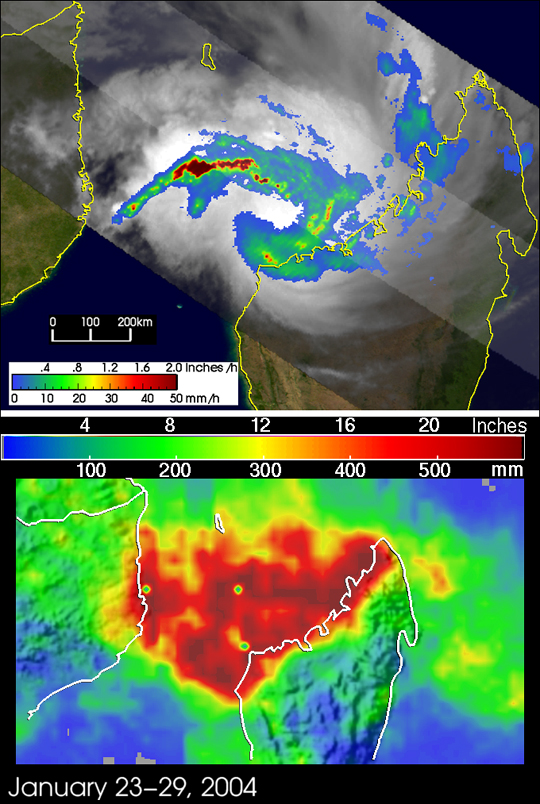
Cyclone Elita rainfall map

Over land, the storm rapidly weakened to a tropical depression, and the JTWC temporarily discontinued issuing advisories. The center of Elita crossed Madagascar, passing near Madagascar's capital Antananarivo, and redeveloped thunderstorms in its eastern periphery. Late on January 29, the circulation emerged into the Indian Ocean near Mahanoro. A ridge to the east turned the system back to the west, allowing the system only about 24 hours over open waters. During that time, the structure reorganized slightly, and the MFR upgraded Elita to a moderate tropical storm on January 30. The storm made its second landfall near Mananjary, and crossed Madagascar a second time over the course of 24 hours.

Early on January 31, Elita emerged again into the Mozambique Channel, and the JTWC began reissuing advisories. With warm waters and low wind shear, Elita re-intensified off the west coast of Madagascar, reaching moderate tropical storm status for a third time on February 1. After moving west-northwestward, the storm stalled on February 2 due to a building ridge to the north. At that time, Elita was about 140 km (85 mi) southwest of where it attained tropical storm status for the first time six days prior. The convection reorganized into a central dense overcast, but unlike its first period of intensification, no eye feature developed. Late on February 2, the JTWC assessed peak winds of 120 km/h (75 mph) – the equivalent of a minimal hurricane. Around that time, Elita moved ashore Madagascar for a third time near Morondava, which reported a minimum barometric pressure of 969.6 mbar (28.63 inHg). Due to the lack of wind observations, the MFR estimated a peak landfall intensity of 110 km/h (70 mph), although the agency noted that the storm could have attained tropical cyclone intensity again.

Crossing Madagascar for a third time, Elita closely followed the trajectory of its second passage, emerging into the Indian Ocean near Manakara on February 3. Despite initial forecasts of re-intensification, Elita accelerated southeastward and lost its remaining convection, leaving its center exposed under the influence of a strong upper-level trough. The structure resembled a subtropical cyclone as the surface circulation became broader. Late on February 4, the JTWC discontinued advisories, and the MFR classified Elita as an extratropical cyclone on the next day. For the next week, the remnants of Elita meandered to the southeast of Madagascar. On February 11, the residual circulation tracked southwestward, only to accelerate southeastward away from the region on February 13, when the MFR ceased monitoring the system.

== Preparations and impact ==
Malawi in southeastern Africa experienced the fringes of the storm, when inflow of the storm brought moisture from the Intertropical Convergence Zone. This produced heavy rainfall of over 150 mm (6 in), which destroyed more than 80 houses and a clinic in Karonga district. The Mozambique National Institute of Meteorology advised people living in Nampula, Zambezia, Sofala, and Inhambane Provinces to make preparations for strong winds and rainfall. Elita impacted four provinces of Mozambique. Much of the impact was along the coast from Inhambane to Nampula. In Nampula province, over 2,000 buildings were destroyed. The most severe damage was to generally poorly built houses. In the city of Nampula, a school was badly damaged, and in Nacala-a-Velha, some residents had to spend the night of January 29 outside.

The precursor to Elita dropped heavy rainfall in the Comoros and Mayotte. In the latter island, 100 to 150 mm (3.9 to 5.9 in) of rainfall within 24 hours produced landslides and contributed to three deaths, when the walls of a house collapsed. During its first landfall on Madagascar, Elita produced wind gusts of around 100 km/h (60 mph) on Mayotte. On Juan de Nova Island in the Mozambique Channel, the storm dropped 403 mm (15.9 in) of rainfall in just 12 hours, with 150 mm (5.9 in) recorded in one hour. The storm brought rough seas, gusty winds, and some precipitation to the southwestern islands in Seychelles.

=== Madagascar ===
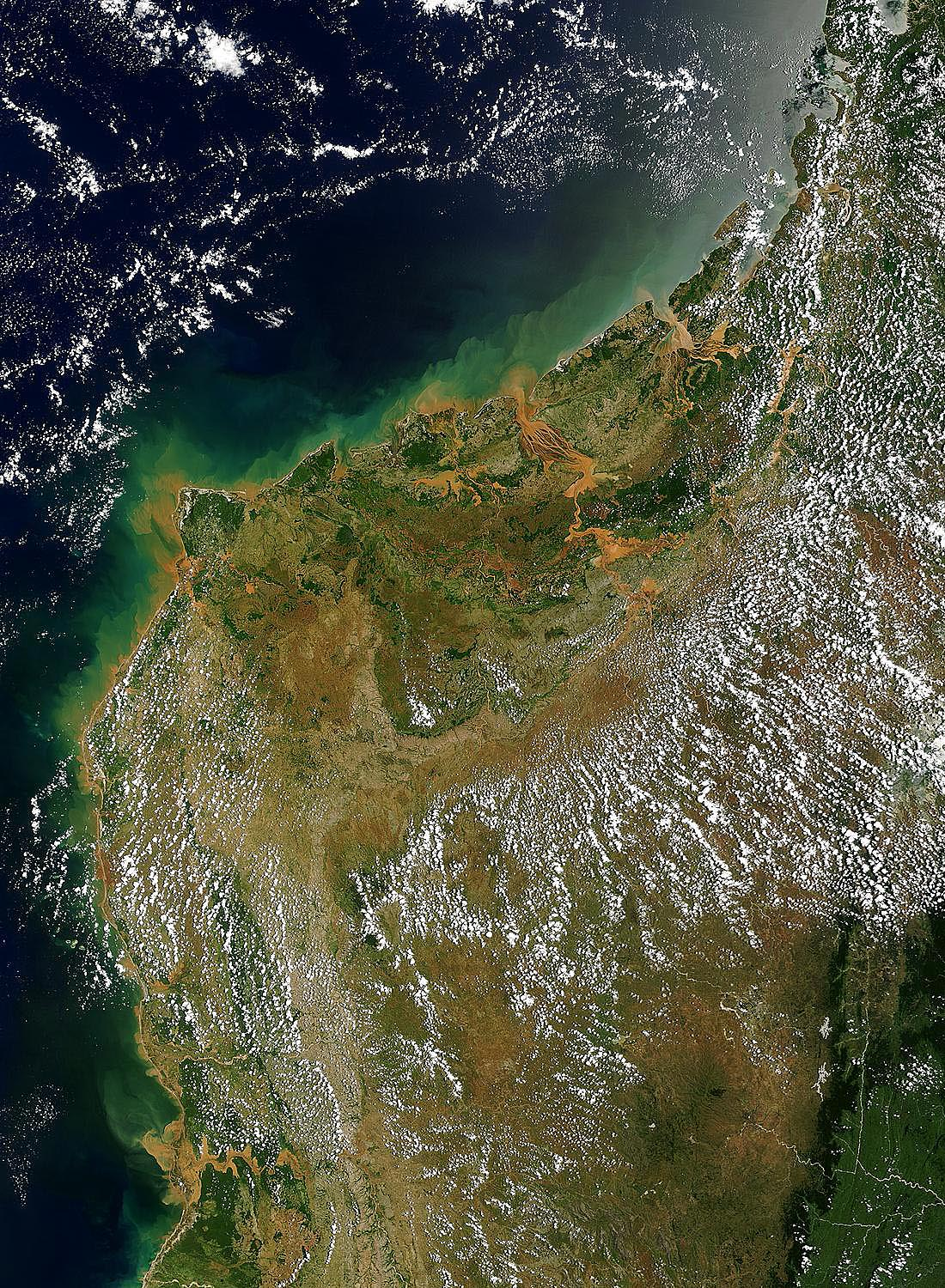
Surface runoff from Cyclone Elita

Throughout Madagascar, the cyclone killed at least 33 people and injured 886 others. Throughout the country, Cyclone Elita destroyed or severely damaged 12,408 homes, which left 55,983 people homeless, primarily in Mahajanga and Toliara. This forced around 7,000 people to seek shelter in either stadiums or in the remaining standing buildings. Additionally, a total of 510 schools and hospitals received major damage. The cyclone affected five of the six provinces of Madagascar, with roads and power being severely disrupted in some areas; at least 39 bridges were damaged or destroyed. Across the nation the storm damaged more than 450 km^{2} (170 sq mi) of agricultural land.

Upon making its first landfall on Madagascar, Elita dropped heavy rainfall along its path, peaking at 715 mm (28.1 in) including a 24‑hour total of 222 mm (8.74 in) in Antsohihy. Wind gusts reached over 180 km/h (110 mph) in Mahajanga near where the storm made its first landfall. A tornado also affected the city during Elita's third transit of Madagascar, which killed two people and destroyed a soap manufacturing plant. The passage of the cyclone left 5,000 people homeless in the vicinity of its first landfall. Along with power and water outages, about 90 percent of the buildings in northwestern Mahajanga Province were damaged by the storm.

Much of Morondava on the west coast was flooded, after a dam near the city collapsed. Maintirano along the west coast was also damaged, as was Soavinandriana in the island's interior. In the capital city Antananarivo, 90 km/h (56 mph) wind gusts caused power outages and damaged part of the Rova, or the Queen's Palace. In Midongy Atismo in southeastern Madagascar, heavy rainfall flooded 80% of rice crop, and the corn and manioc crops were both similarly affected. These represent the staple foods of the population.

== Aftermath ==
On February 13, 2004, officials in Madagascar issued an appeal for international aid. By a month after the storm, the governments of France, the United States, Germany, and Japan sent a total of $287,000 (2004 USD) in assistance. The government of France sent a plane with food, medicine, and other equipment to the affected areas. The government of Germany sent aid to be used for foods and medicines. On February 27, the government of Japan sent aid to the country, including tents, generators, and plastic sheets.

Officials distributed emergency relief items to the affected areas, including rice, sugar, soap, candles, matches and water purification tablets. In Morondava in Toliara Province, the government distributed 4 tons of rice seed, while in Ambatolampy in Antananarivo Province, the government sent 10 tons of rice; additionally, the World Food Programme sent 80 tons of flour to the nation. The combined efforts of the United Nations and aid agencies repaired the schools and distributed meals to the families affected by the disaster. Workers in association with the Madagascar Red Cross set up a water system that provided about 45,000 litres (11,900 gallons) of drinkable water per day.

The impact of Cyclone Elita was severely compounded by Cyclone Gafilo about two months later, which killed hundreds and left over 240,000 people homeless.

== See also ==
- Wettest tropical cyclones in Madagascar
- Cyclone Felicie - struck Madagascar four times in 1971
