= 2003–04 South-West Indian Ocean cyclone season =

Cyclone season in the Southwest Indian Ocean

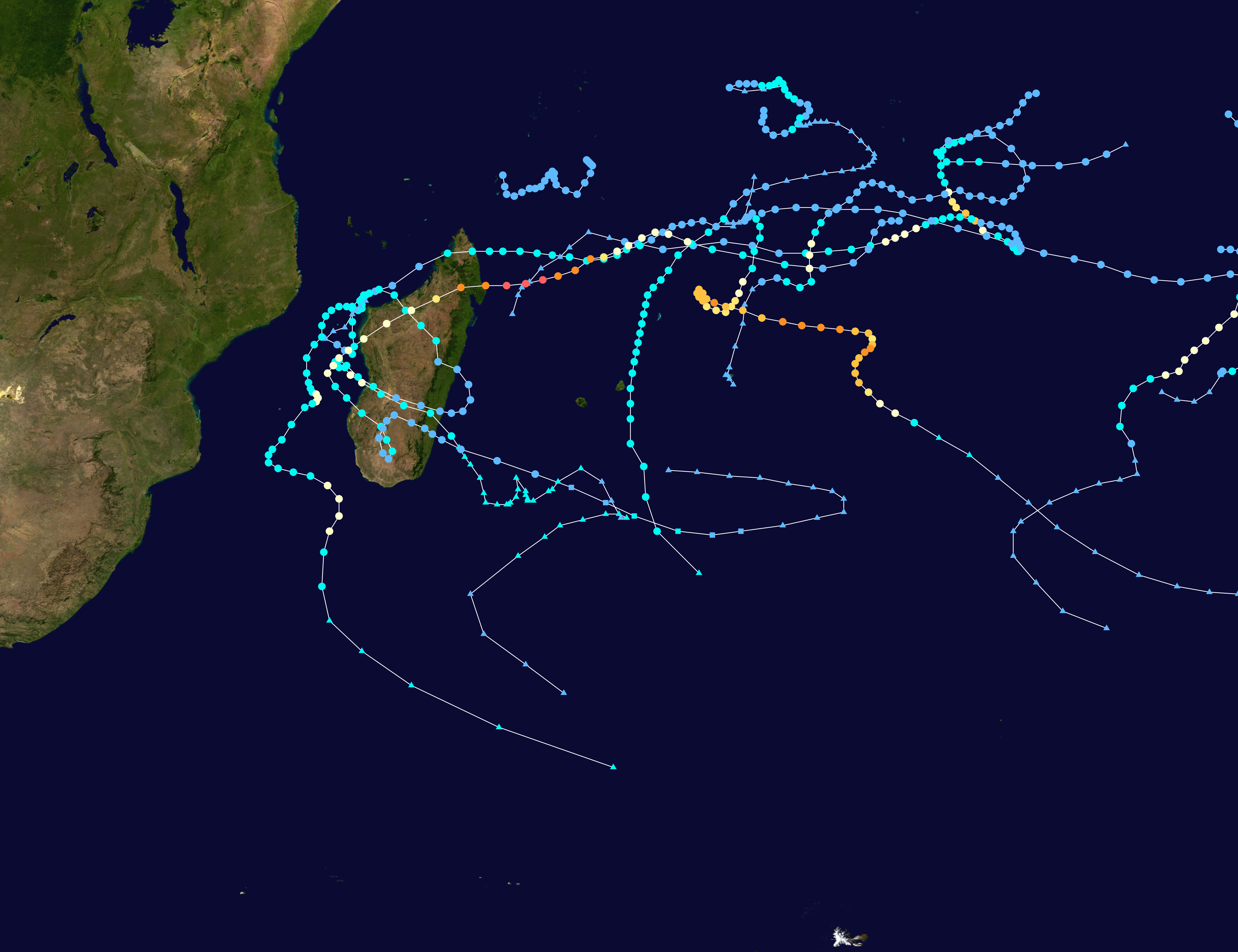
- Season summary map

Seasonal boundaries
- First system formed: September 28, 2003
- Last system dissipated: May 24, 2004

Strongest storm
- Name: Gafilo (Most intense cyclone in Southwest Indian Ocean on record)
  - Maximum winds: 230 km/h (145 mph) (10-minute sustained)
  - Lowest pressure: 895 hPa (mbar)

Seasonal statistics
- Total disturbances: 16
- Total depressions: 10
- Total storms: 10
- Tropical cyclones: 5
- Intense tropical cyclones: 3
- Very intense tropical cyclones: 1
- Total fatalities: 396 total
- Total damage: $250 million (2004 USD)

Related articles
- 2003–04 Australian region cyclone season; 2003–04 South Pacific cyclone season

The 2003–04 South-West Indian Ocean cyclone season featured the most intense tropical cyclone in the South-West Indian Ocean, Cyclone Gafilo, as well as nine other named storms. Tropical activity began on September 28 when Moderate Tropical Storm Abaimba formed at a low latitude. Activity continued until late May, following Severe Tropical Storm Juba, which marked the third year in a row that a storm formed in May. The final disturbance, one of sixteen, dissipated on May 24. Activity was near average, and the season was one of the longest on record.

The first intense tropical cyclone was Beni, which reached that intensity on November 13, the third-earliest on record. In December, Tropical Cyclone Cela moved across Madagascar, and Severe Tropical Storm Darius dropped heavy rainfall in the Mascarene Islands. In January, Cyclone Elita crossed Madagascar three times, which caused widespread flooding and 33 deaths. Also in that month was Intense Tropical Cyclone Frank, which developed quickly but remained away from land. On March 7, Cyclone Gafilo struck near Antalaha in northeast Madagascar and largely destroyed the town. Across the country, the storm destroyed over 20,000 homes, leaving 304,000 people homeless. Nationwide, the storm killed 363 people and left $250 million in damage (2004 USD). Later in March, two storms – Nicky and Oscar – crossed 90° E from the Australian basin and were renamed Helma and Itseng, respectively. Tropical cyclones in this basin are monitored by the Regional Specialised Meteorological Centre in Réunion.

== Season summary ==
Météo-France's meteorological office in Réunion (MFR) is the official Regional Specialized Meteorological Center for the South-West Indian Ocean, tracking all tropical cyclones from the east coast of Africa to 90° E. The agency tracked 16 tropical disturbances during the season, of which ten intensified into tropical storms and were named from a sequential list. This is near the long-term average of nine tropical storms. Five storms intensified to tropical cyclone status, with maximum sustained winds of at least 120 km/h (75 mph); this is also near the long-term average. There were 19 days – one less than average – in which a tropical cyclone was active. The Joint Typhoon Warning Center (JTWC), which is a joint United States Navy – United States Air Force task force– also issued advisories for storms in the basin.

Similar to the preceding season, the 2003–04 season began in September and ended the following May, making it one of the lengthiest on record. Most storms originated near the Chagos Archipelago in the central Indian Ocean. Two storms – Helma and Itseng – crossed from the Australian basin and were tracked by the Bureau of Meteorology (BoM). Many of the storms had unusual trajectories, with sudden changes in direction. Cyclone Elita crossed the coastline of Madagascar three times, described by the MFR as an "exotic" track but akin to Cyclone Felicie in 1971. The final storm – Juba – was the third-latest named storm on record, after Ikonjo in May 1990 and Gritelle in June 1991. Through 2003, three tropical cyclones formed outside the cyclone season in the basin, becoming at the time the highest off-season tropical storms in the year. However, this record was surpassed in 2024 with a record high of four named storms.

== Systems ==
=== Moderate Tropical Storm Abaimba ===
- Moderate tropical storm (MFR)
- Tropical storm (SSHWS)
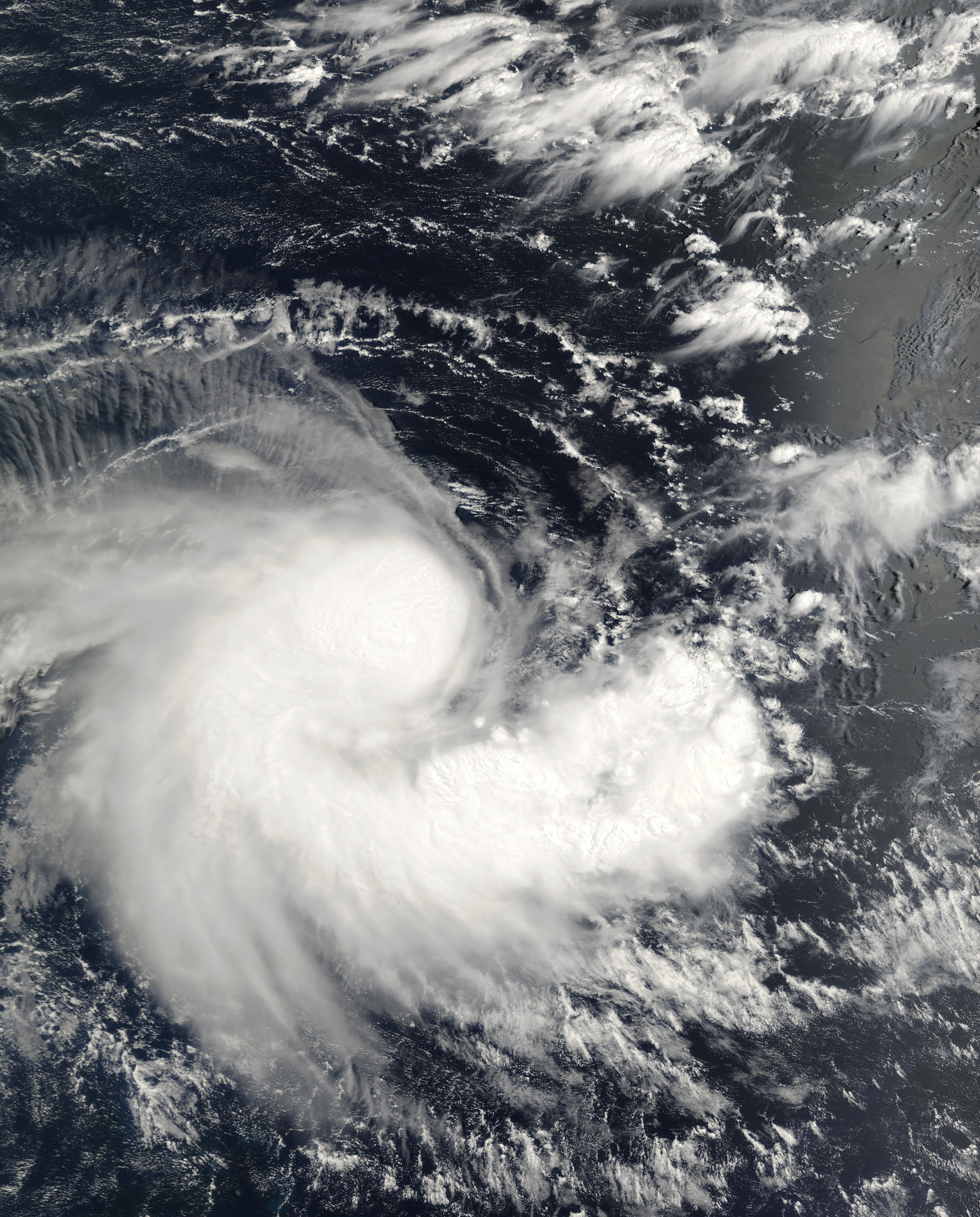
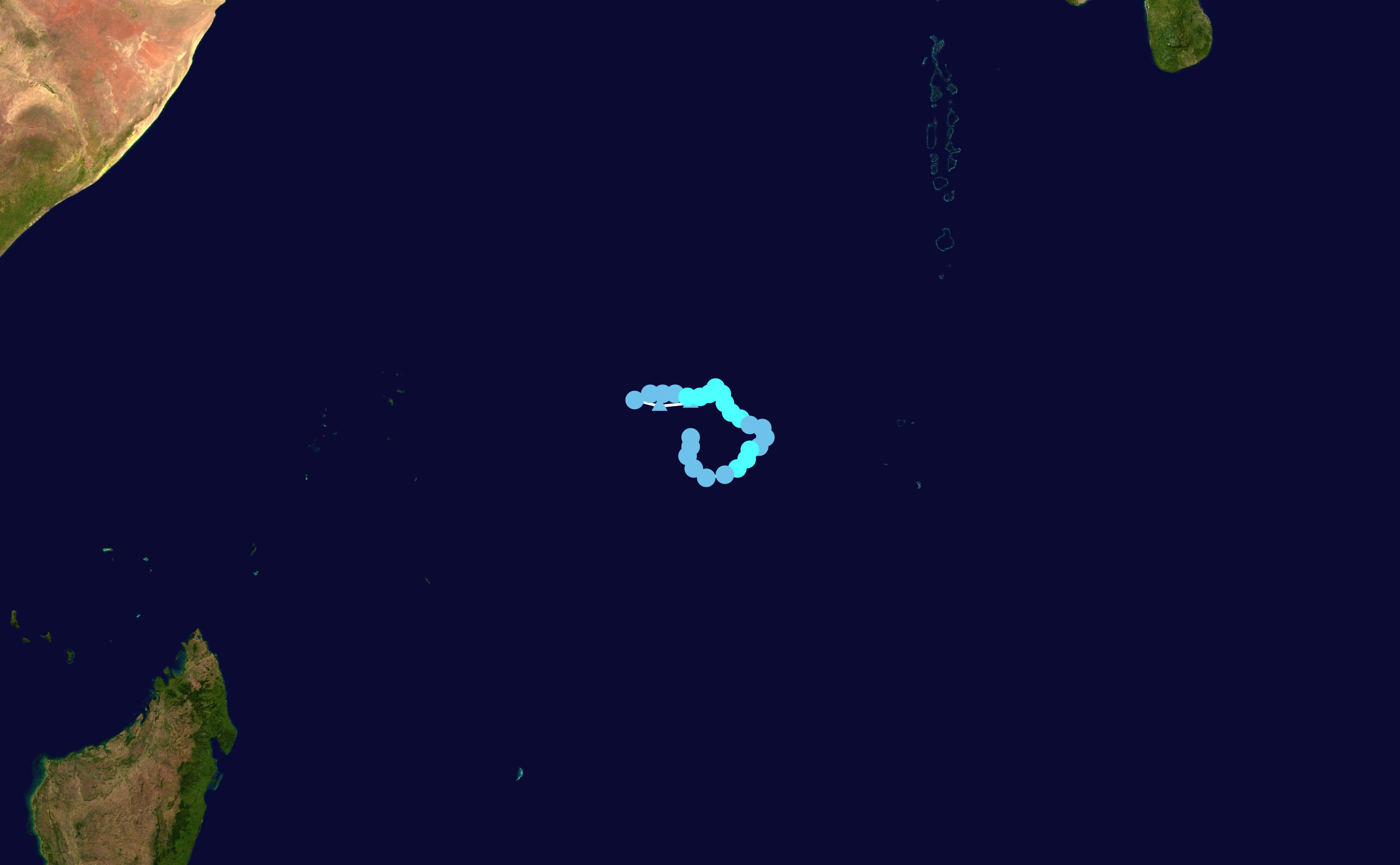
- Duration: September 28 – October 4
- Peak intensity: 80 km/h (50 mph) (10-min); 995 hPa (mbar)

On September 28, the first tropical disturbance of the season originated as a circulation within the near-equatorial trough, west of the Chagos Archipelago. Despite moderate wind shear and minimal convection at first, the system developed an organized area of thunderstorms over the center. The swirl was influenced by the trade winds, moving westward at first before turning to the east. The MFR upgraded the system to a tropical depression on September 29, and on the same day, the JTWC initiated advisories on the storm as Tropical Cyclone 01S. The circulation became exposed from the convection before developing another plume of thunderstorms on October 1. That day, the MFR upgraded the depression to Moderate Tropical Storm Abaimba, estimating peak winds of 80 km/h (50 mph), similar to the JTWC estimate. At the low latitude of 4.4º S, Abaimba became the first named storm in the basin north of 5º S. Wind shear increased late on October 1, leaving the center exposed again. On the next day, Abaimba weakened into a tropical depression. The trajectory shifted to the south and west as it moved in a broad loop, until stalling on October 4. That day, it was no longer classifiable as a tropical disturbance, and the circulation dissipated on October 6.

=== Intense Tropical Cyclone Beni ===
- Intense tropical cyclone (MFR)
- Category 3 tropical cyclone (SSHWS)
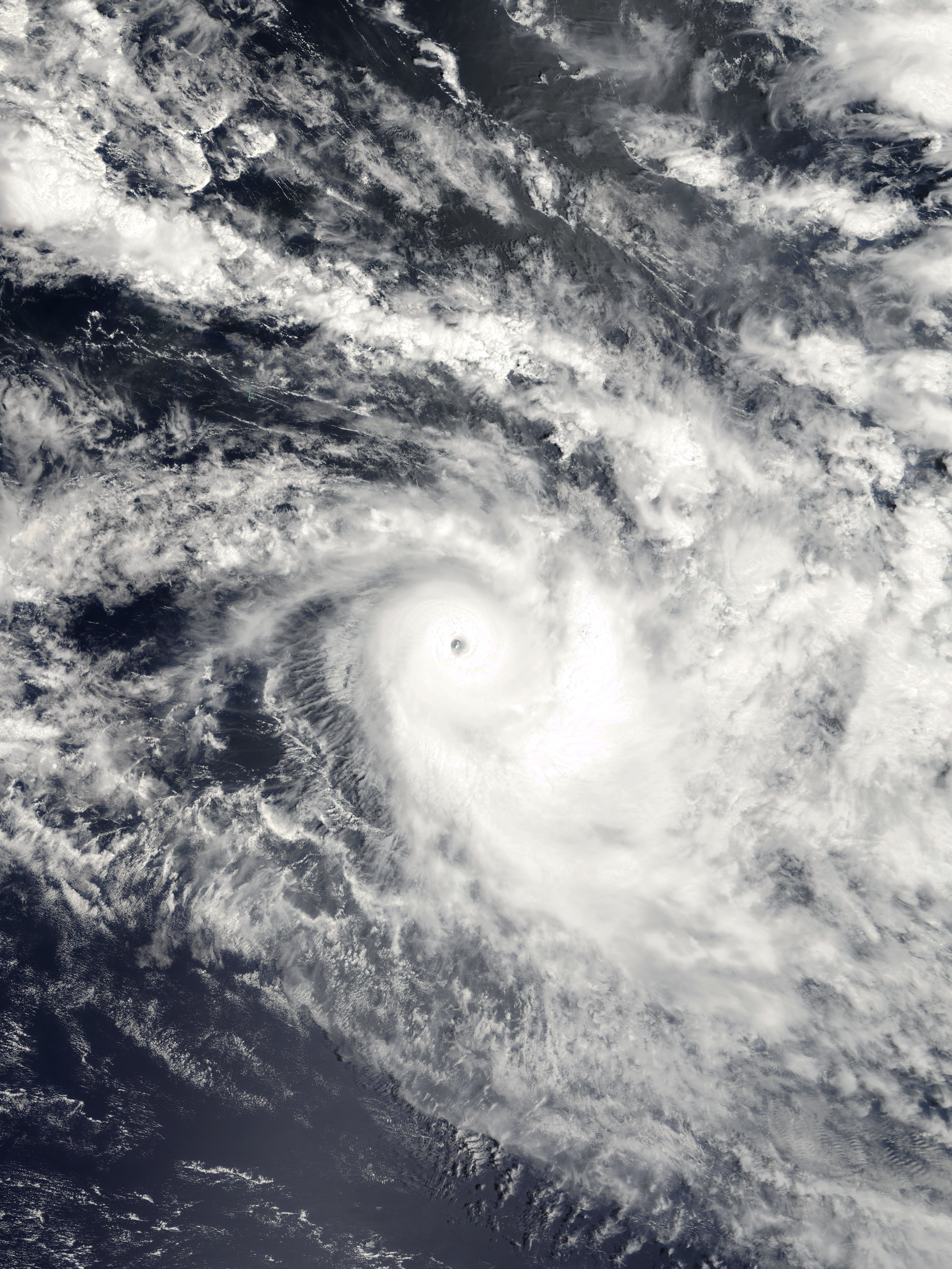
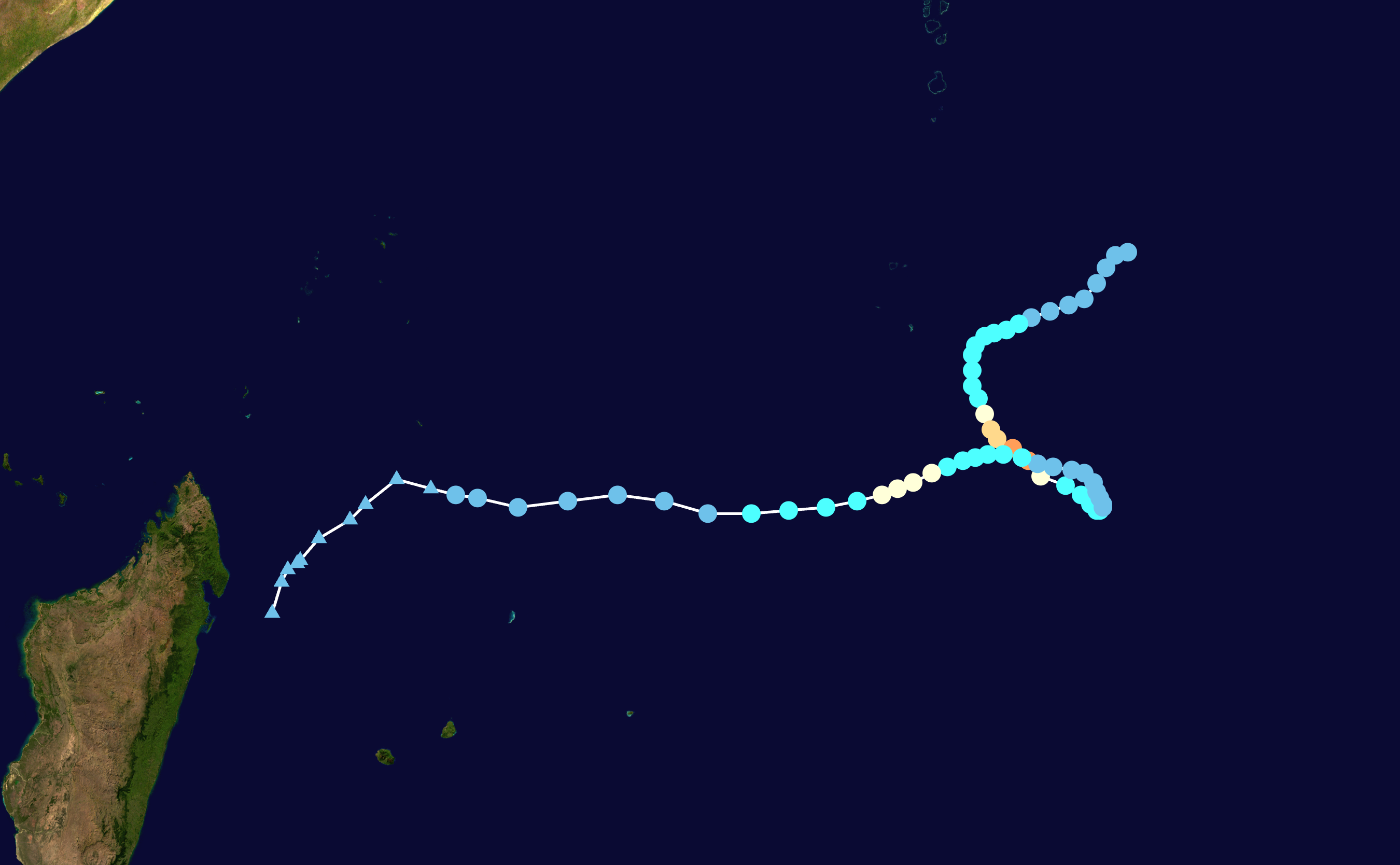
- Duration: November 9 – November 25
- Peak intensity: 175 km/h (110 mph) (10-min); 935 hPa (mbar)

The same westerly wind burst that spawned a cyclonic storm in the Arabian Sea also produced Cyclone Beni. On November 7, an area of sprawling convection developed northeast of Diego Garcia. This system consolidated and organized, aided by decreasing wind shear, warm waters, and good outflow. On November 9, the MFR classified the system as a tropical disturbance, and the JTWC designated it as Tropical Cyclone 02S. Two days later, the MFR upgraded it to Moderate Tropical Storm Beni. Moving around a ridge, the storm trekked southwestward before turning to the southeast on November 12, steered by an approaching trough. That day, Beni intensified into the first tropical cyclone of the year. Its outflow was enhanced by the trough, and a well-defined eye became established within the convection. On November 13, the MFR upgraded Beni to an intense tropical cyclone, estimating peak 10 minute winds of 175 km/h (110 mph); at the time, it was the third earliest in the season that a storm reached that intensity. The JTWC estimated slightly higher 1 minute winds of 185 km/h (115 mph).

A small cyclone, Beni rapidly weakened due to increased wind shear. By November 14 – a day after reaching peak intensity – the circulation of Beni became exposed as the winds decreased to tropical storm force. A day later, the storm weakened into a tropical disturbance and turned to a northwest drift, steered in the trade winds. Thunderstorms redeveloped as the shear diminished, and Beni re-intensified into a tropical storm on November 18 while crossing over its earlier path. Moving westward, the storm redeveloped an eye and re-attained tropical cyclone status on November 19, reaching a secondary peak intensity of 140 km/h (85 mph) about 500 km (300 mi)) south of Diego Garcia. Cooler waters weakened Beni a day later, and the storm fell to tropical disturbance status by November 21. Thunderstorms reformed intermittently as the system turned to the southwest. The circulation dissipated on November 25 to the southeast of Madagascar. Moisture from the storm brought heavy rainfall to the Mascarene Islands, with 100 to 150 mm (3.9 to 5.9 in) of precipitation recorded on the eastern side of Réunion.

=== Tropical Cyclone Cela ===
- Tropical cyclone (MFR)
- Category 1 tropical cyclone (SSHWS)
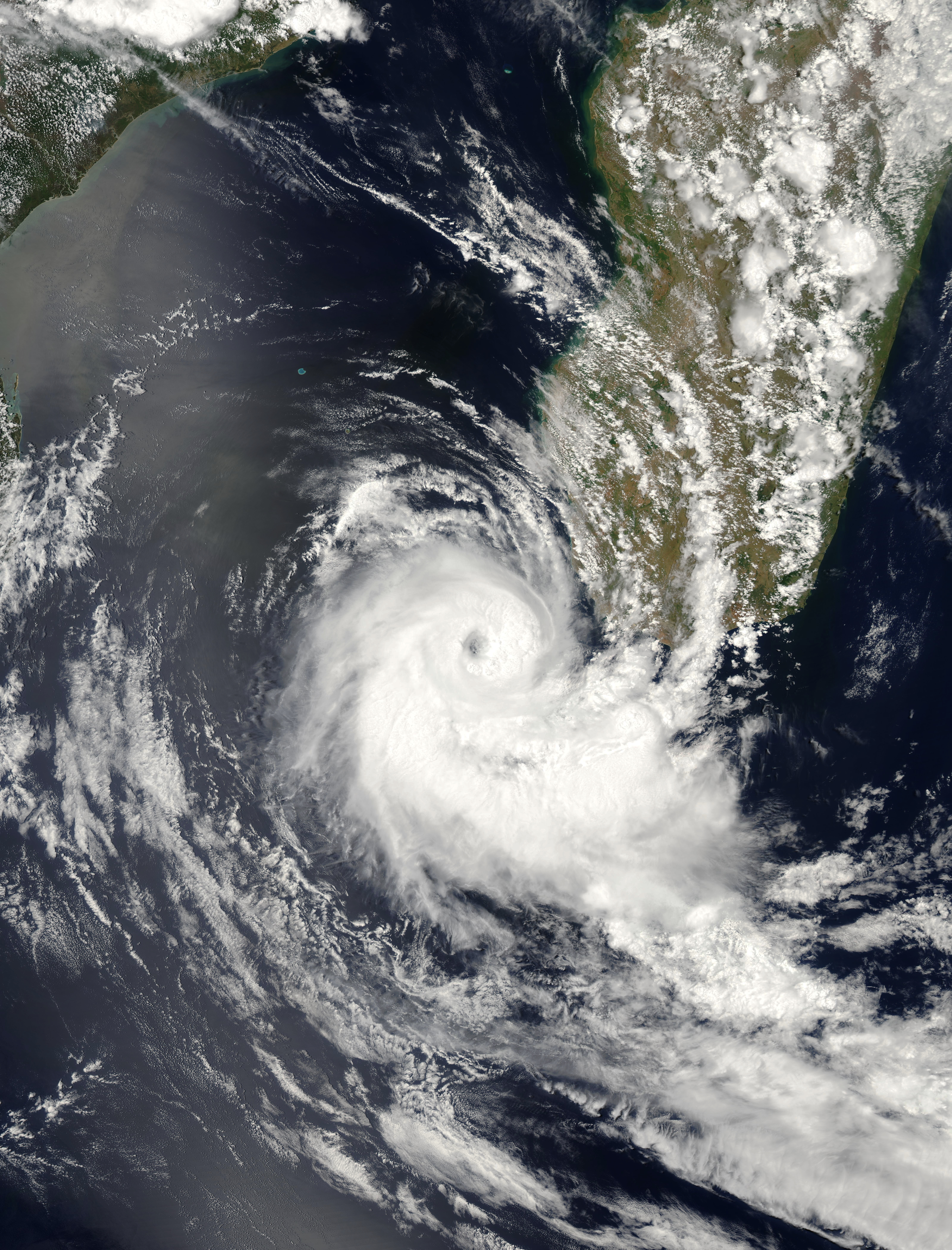
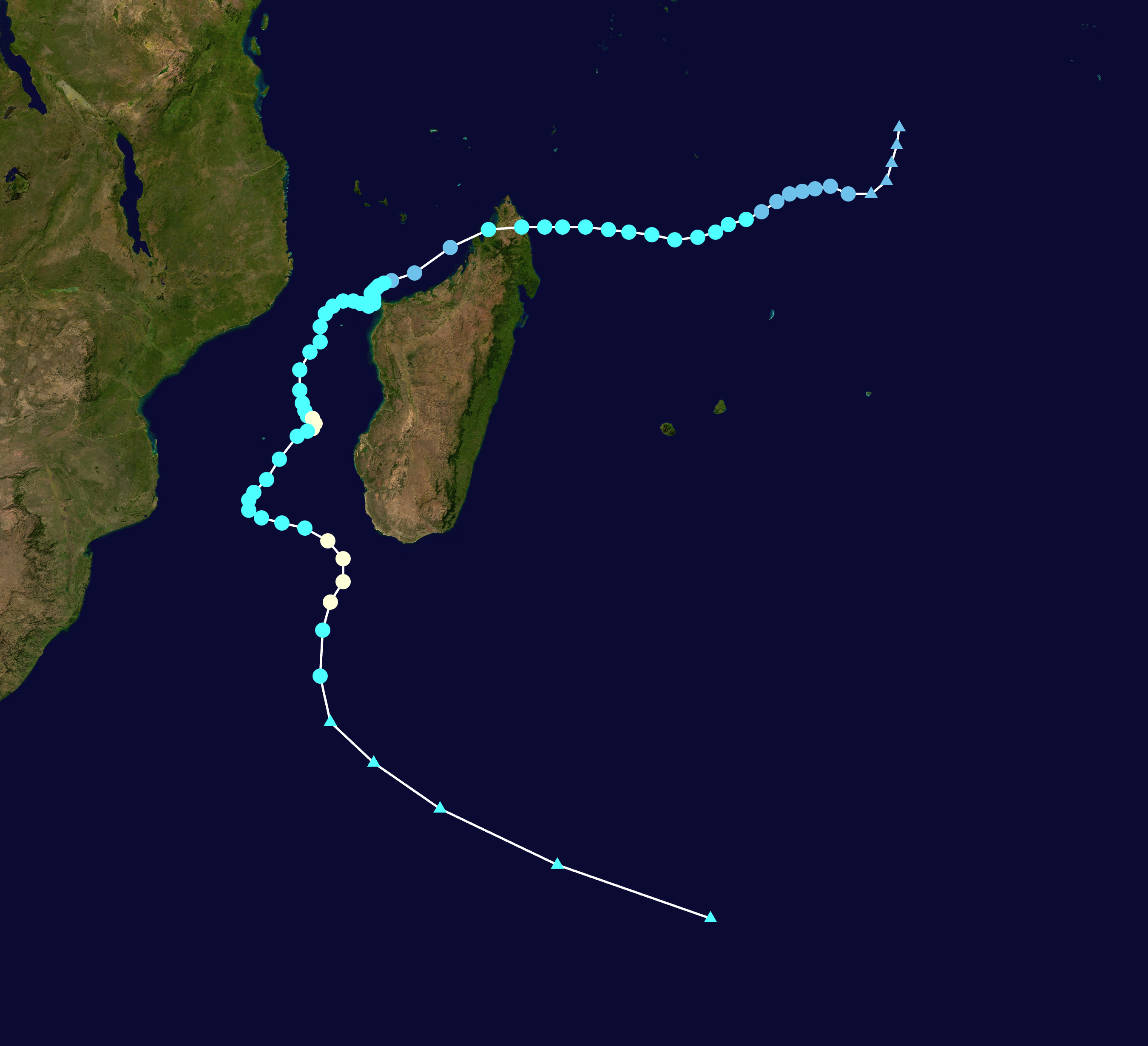
- Duration: December 4 – December 20
- Peak intensity: 120 km/h (75 mph) (10-min); 975 hPa (mbar)

In early December, the near-equatorial trough was active to the north of the Mascarene Islands, which spawned a circulation near Diego Garcia. This circulation became more defined moving southwestward, and was designated Tropical Disturbance 3 by the MFR on December 4. A day later, the JTWC began issuing advisories as Tropical Cyclone 03S. Dry air hindered development at first, but was counteracted by decreasing wind shear. The weather system intensified into Moderate Tropical Storm Cela on December 7. Failing to organize much, the storm attained winds of 75 km/h (45 mph) and made landfall at that intensity near Vohemar in northern Madagascar. Wind gusts there reached 184 km/h (114 mph). The circulation became disrupted over the mountainous terrain of the island, and emerged into the Mozambique Channel on December 10 as a weak tropical disturbance. Unable to observe a low-level circulation, the JTWC discontinued advisories that day.

Abundant moisture fueled the convection in the Mozambique Channel, although Cela's proximity to land hindered redevelopment. On December 14, the system moved far enough from Madagascar that it re-intensified into a moderate tropical storm near Juan de Nova Island; this island recorded wind gusts of 112 km/h (70 mph) and 289 mm (11.4 in) of rainfall during the passage. As Cela moved southward, its convective structure organized further, developing an eye in the center. On December 16, the storm attained tropical cyclone status while stalling west of Madagascar, with maximum sustained winds of 120 km/h (75 mph). For the next four days, Cela's intensity fluctuated between tropical cyclone intensity or just below, affected by upwelling and periodic increases in wind shear. After a southwestward trajectory for a day, Cela turned southeastward and later to the south. It passed near Europa Island, which recorded a peak gust of 152 km/h (94 mph). On December 20, Cela transitioned into an extratropical cyclone, affected by cooler water temperatures and the higher wind shear. The storm accelerated southeastward and was last noted by the MFR on December 22.

For much of its duration, Cela was located near or over Madagascar, and most of the country received 75 to 150 mm (3.0 to 5.9 in) of rainfall. On the west coast, Morombe reported a 24-hour precipitation total of 317 mm (12.5 in).

=== Severe Tropical Storm Darius ===
- Severe tropical storm (MFR)
- Tropical storm (SSHWS)
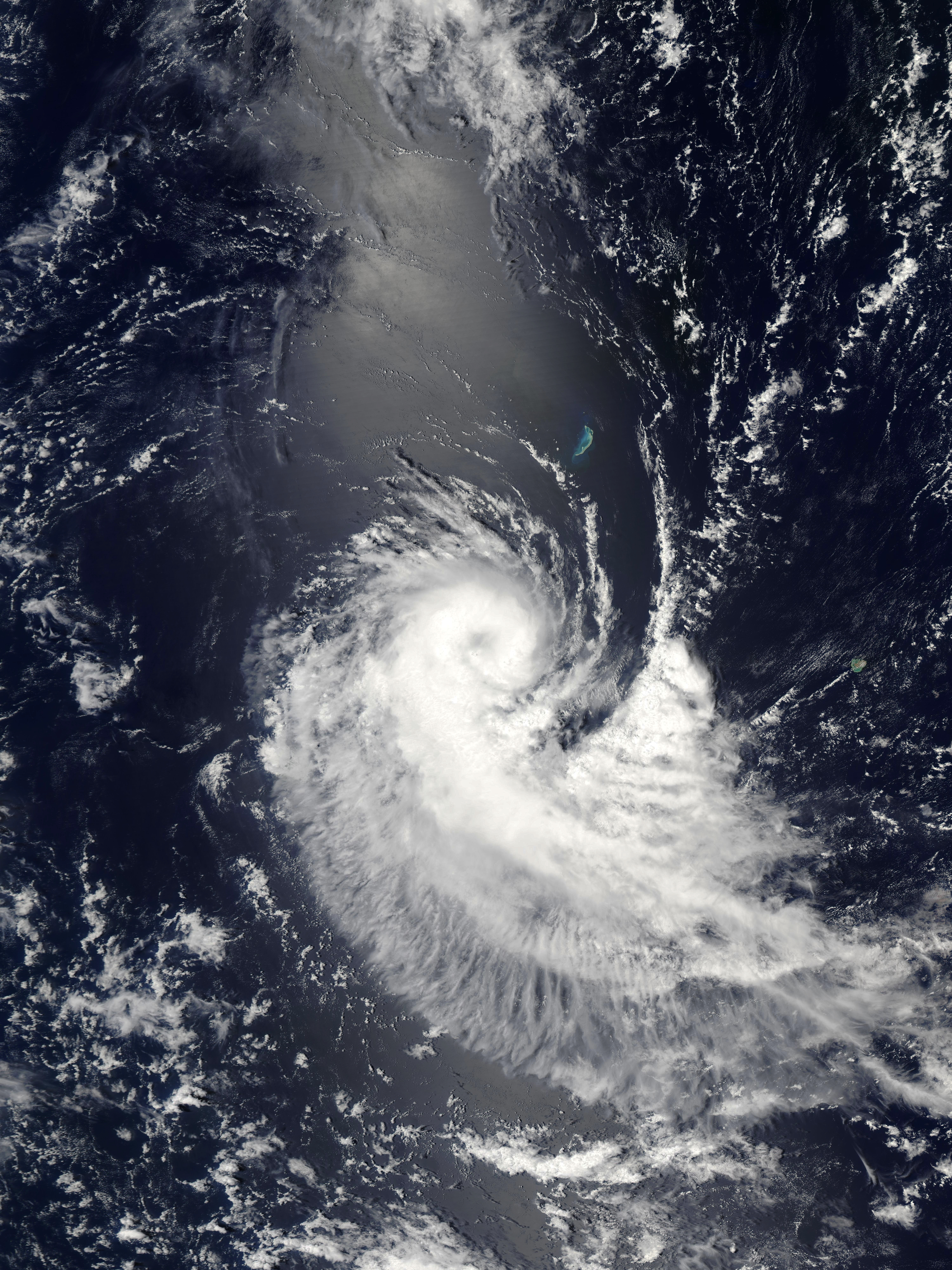
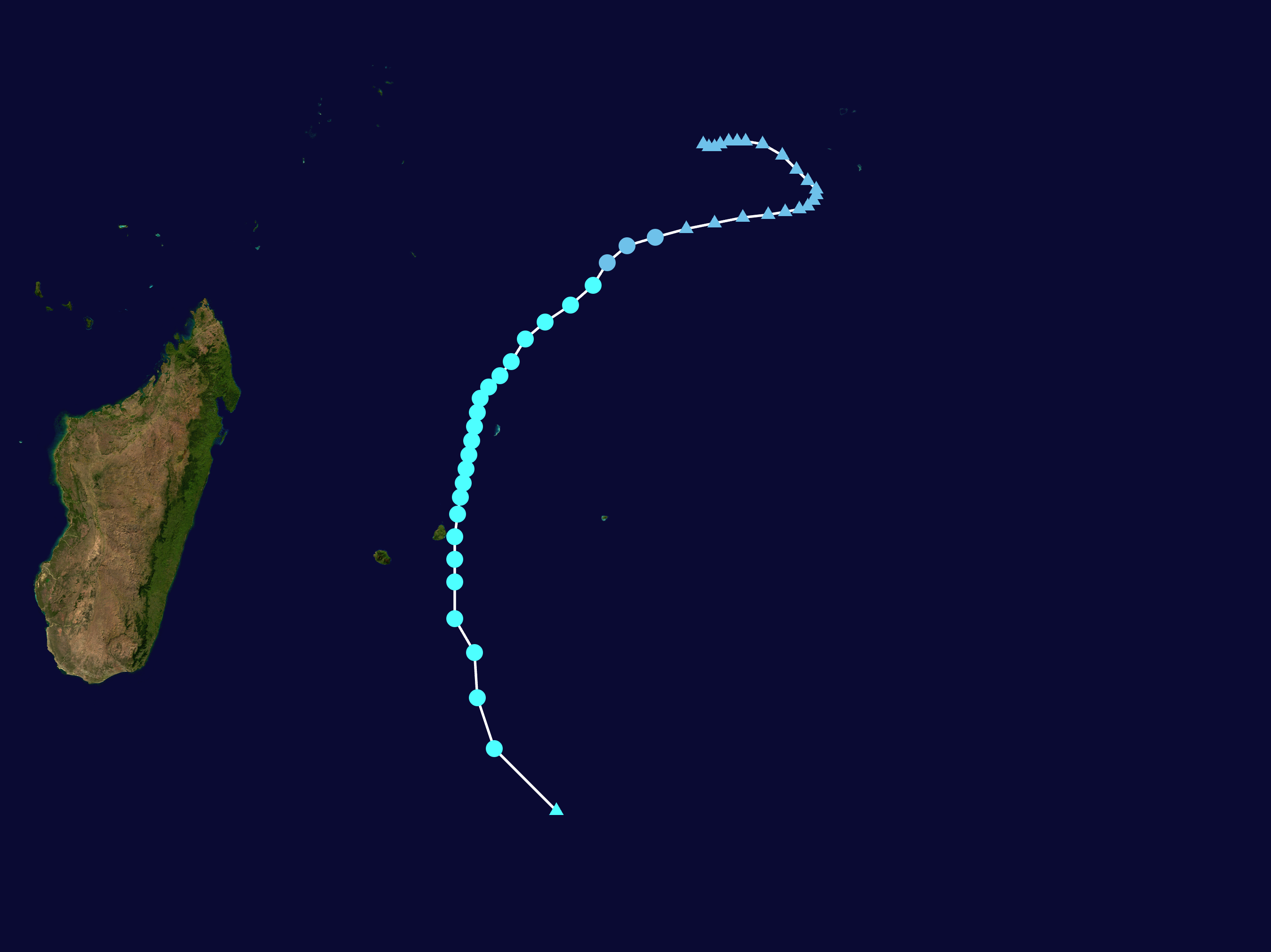
- Duration: December 27 – January 4
- Peak intensity: 100 km/h (65 mph) (10-min); 980 hPa (mbar)

A broad area of convection associated with the near-equatorial trough persisted on December 24, in tandem with a circulation southwest of Diego Garcia. For several days, the thunderstorms pulsated without much development. On December 27, the MFR designated the system as Tropical Disturbance 4, and more earnest convective development ensued. Moving southwestward around a ridge to the southeast, the disturbance intensified into Moderate Tropical Storm Darius on December 30. On the next day, an eye feature developed, indicative of a stronger storm. Both the MFR and the JTWC estimated peak winds of 100 km/h (60 mph) on December 31. A trough to the west prevented further development and steered Darius more to the south, bringing it east of St. Brandon on January 1. On the next day, the severe tropical storm passed just 15 km (9.3 mi) east of Mahébourg, Mauritius. An approaching cold front accelerated Darius to the south and south-southeast toward an area of higher wind shear. On January 4, the MFR declared the storm as extratropical.

On the sparsely populated St. Brandon archipelago, wind gusts reached 121 km/h (75 mph) during the storm. The large circulation of Darius brought heavy rainfall to the Mascarene Islands, which helped end a drought in Mauritius. Rains there peaked at 271 mm (10.7 in), and wind gusts on the island peaked at 112 km/h (70 mph), located in the weaker quadrant of the storm.

=== Tropical Cyclone Elita ===
- Tropical cyclone (MFR)
- Category 1 tropical cyclone (SSHWS)
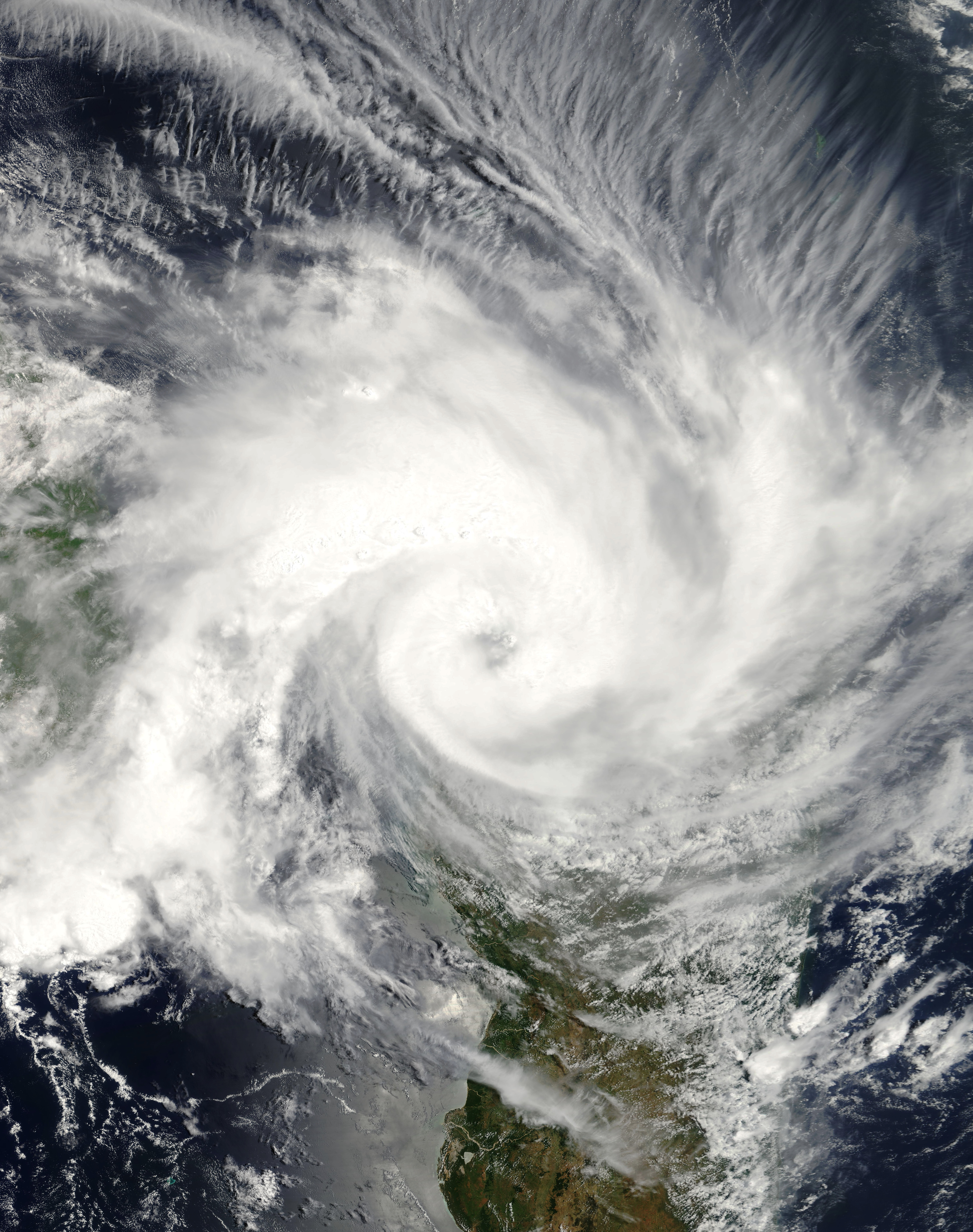
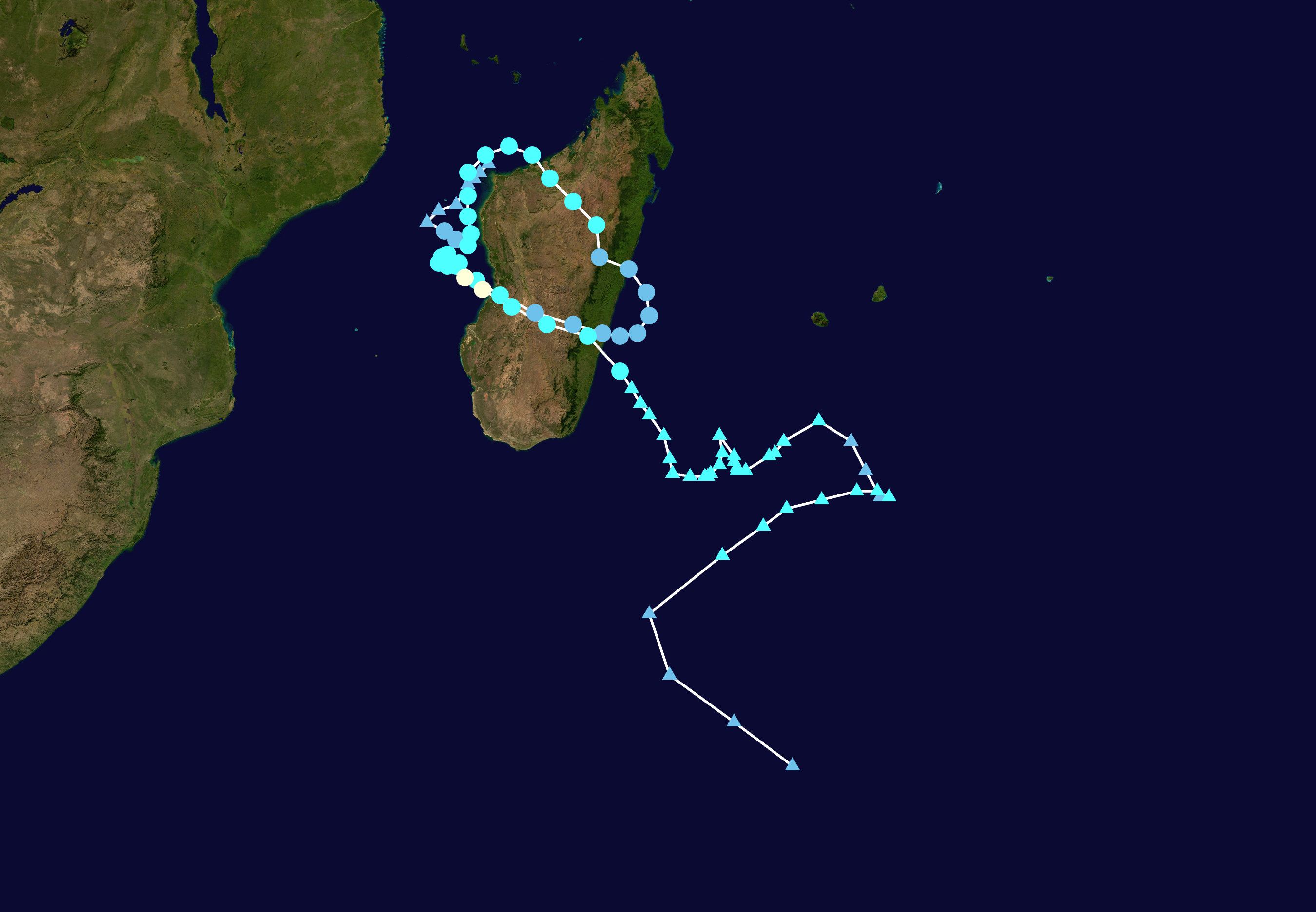
- Duration: January 24 – February 4
- Peak intensity: 120 km/h (75 mph) (10-min); 970 hPa (mbar)

Tropical Disturbance 06 developed in the Mozambique Channel on January 24 off the west coast of Madagascar. Drifting southwestward at first, the system became more defined and shifted its trajectory to the north. The JTWC initiated advisories on January 26 as Tropical Cyclone 09S, and on the same day, the MFR upgraded the system to Moderate Tropical Storm Elita. A ridge to the northeast turned the storm toward the southeast, and Elita made its first landfall on Madagascar on January 28 near Mahajanga. The airport there recorded 10 minute sustained winds of 126 km/h (78 mph), warranting an upgrade to tropical cyclone status. Elita was the first storm of that intensity to strike western Madagascar since Cyclone Cynthia in 1991.

Over land, the weakening system moved southeastward, emerging into the western Indian Ocean on January 29. After weakening to tropical depression status, Elita re-intensified into a moderate tropical storm, turned westward, and made a second landfall near Mananjary on January 30. The storm reemerged into the Mozambique Channel and stalled off western Madagascar before turning back to the southeast. On February 2, the JTWC estimated peak winds of 120 km/h (75 mph), but the MFR maintained Elita as a severe tropical storm due to lack of observations. On the same day, the storm made its third and final landfall near Morondava, crossing the country and emerging near Manakara. Elita lost its remaining convection and transitioned into a hybrid storm, before the MFR declared the storm as extratropical on February 5. The remnants meandered for about a week, finally exiting the region on February 13.

Elita dropped heavy rainfall of over 200 mm (7.9 in), which damaged or destroyed thousands of houses in Madagascar. Over 55,000 people were left homeless, primarily in Mahajanga and Toliara provinces. Flooding from the storm damaged or destroyed more than 450 km^{2} (170 sq mi) of agricultural land. Across the island, the cyclone caused at least 33 deaths, and the impacts were compounded by Cyclone Gafilo's deadly passage about two months later. Elsewhere, the cyclone brought rainfall and damage to Mozambique and Malawi, while its outer circulation produced rough seas and strong winds in Seychelles, Mauritius, and Réunion.

=== Intense Tropical Cyclone Frank ===
- Intense tropical cyclone (MFR)
- Category 4 tropical cyclone (SSHWS)
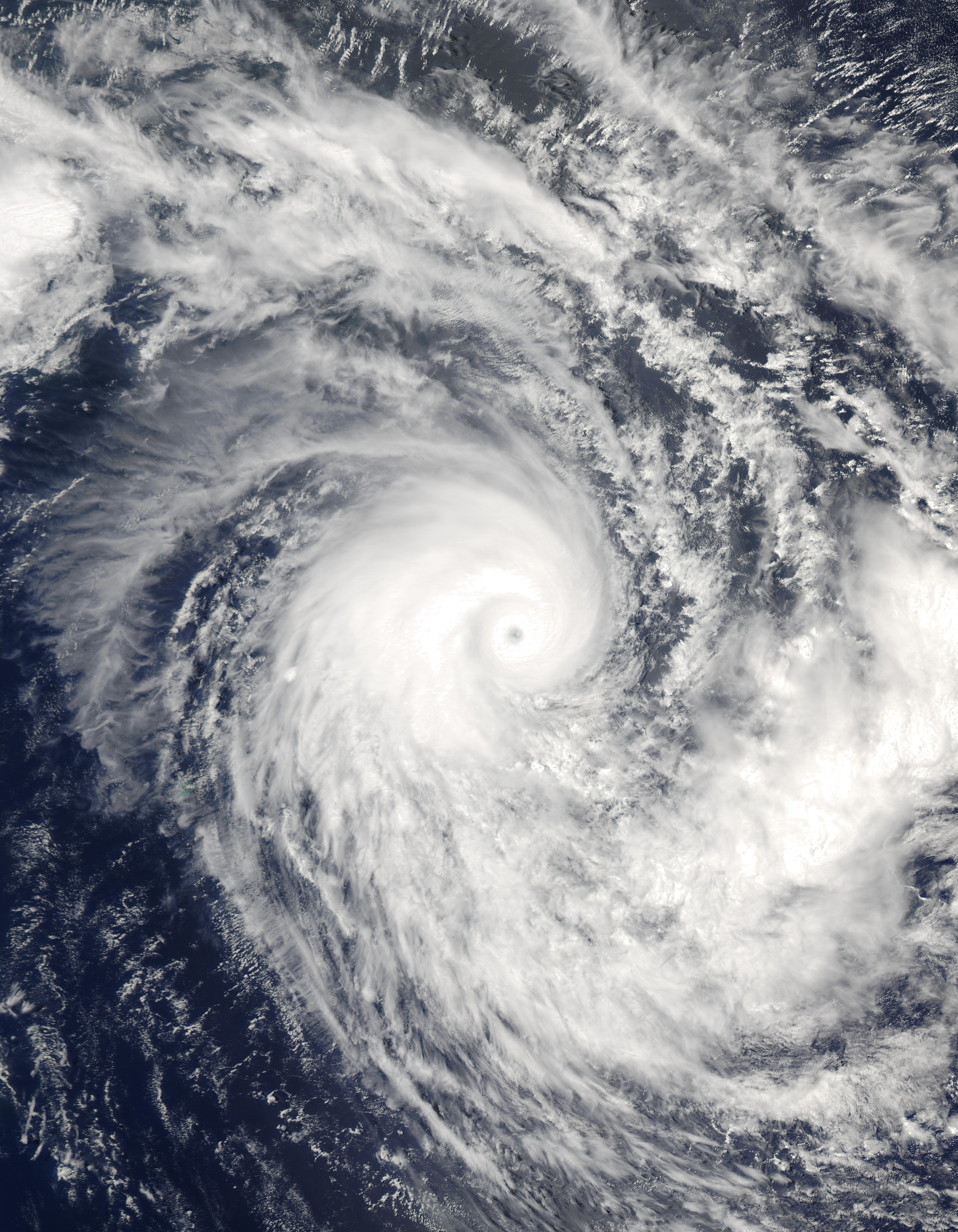
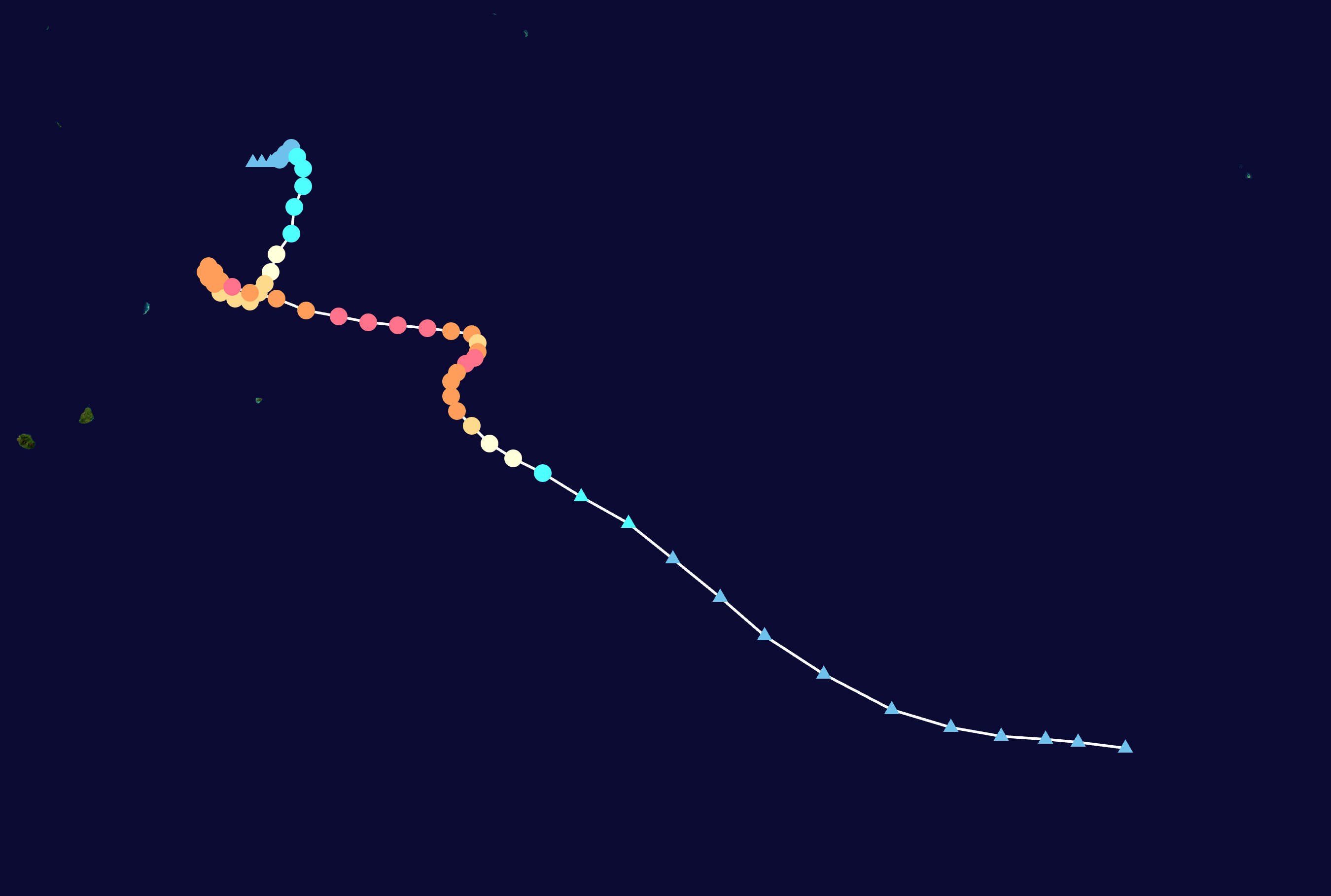
- Duration: January 26 – February 6
- Peak intensity: 185 km/h (115 mph) (10-min); 930 hPa (mbar)

A strong pulse in the Madden–Julian oscillation (MJO) produced a circulation in the Intertropical Convergence Zone to the north of Rodrigues on January 26, which developed into a tropical disturbance that day. This was the same weather system that spawned Cyclone Elita near Madagascar and Tropical Cyclone Linda northwest of Australia. A day earlier, convection increased in the region, fueled by decreasing wind shear and an otherwise favorable environment. The disturbance quickly intensified in these conditions, and was upgraded to Moderate Tropical Storm Frank on January 28. Soon after, a small eye developed within the convection. Frank attained tropical cyclone intensity on January 29, a rate of development the MFR remarked as "explosive." A passing trough enhanced the outflow of the small storm, but also weakened the eye and halted development due to wind shear.

After a general path to the southwest, the storm turned to the west-northwest on January 30 into an area of lighter wind shear. Attaining winds of 165 km/h (105 mph), Frank redeveloped an eye and was upgraded to an intense tropical cyclone by the MFR. Steered by high-pressure areas in the vicinity, the cyclone turned back to the southeast. It weakened while crossing its former path, where water temperatures had dropped due to upwelling. After reaching warmer waters, Frank re-intensified and attained a peak intensity of 185 km/h (115 mph) on February 2, according to the MFR. The JTWC estimated peak winds of 145 mph (235 km/h). The intensity fluctuated for two days, when a definitive weakening trend began. The cyclone turned to the southwest and encountered stronger wind shear. Frank resumed its southeast path on February 5 as the center became dislocated from the convection. A day later, the MFR declared the storm as extratropical, and followed the residual low for three more days.

=== Very Intense Tropical Cyclone Gafilo ===
- Very intense tropical cyclone (MFR)
- Category 5 tropical cyclone (SSHWS)
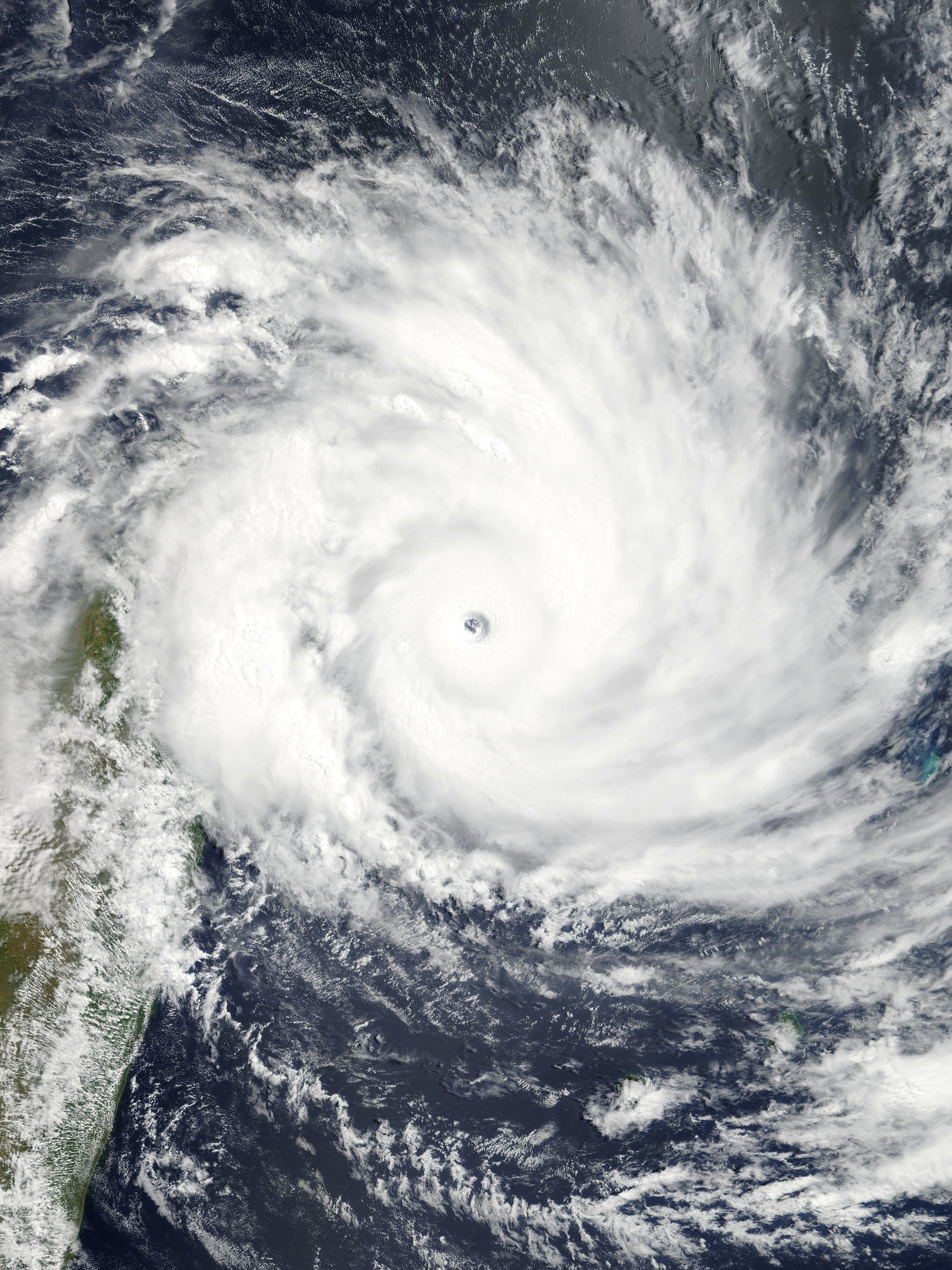
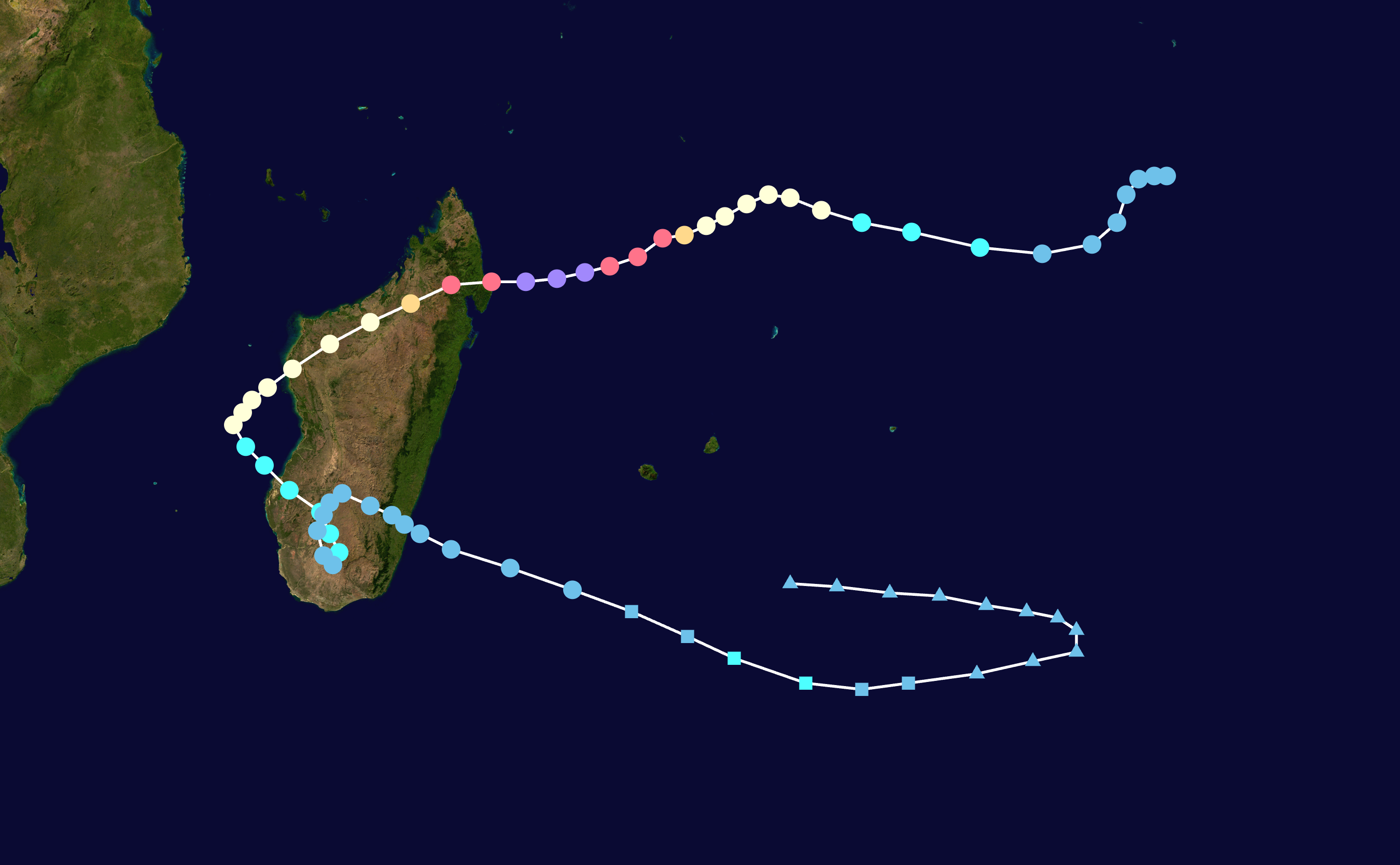
- Duration: March 1 – March 15
- Peak intensity: 230 km/h (145 mph) (10-min); 895 hPa (mbar)

In early March, an expansive area of convection persisted near the Chagos archipelago, related to the monsoon trough. The eastern half of the system would eventually become Severe Tropical Storm Nicky–Helma. The western half organized into a tropical disturbance on March 1. Steered by a ridge to the south, the system tracked generally westward, intensifying into Moderate Tropical Storm Gafilo on March 3. By the next day, Gafilo intensified to tropical cyclone status, aided by decreasing wind shear and the warmest waters of the year. The storm had a large size, extending 1,700 km (1,100 mi) from the Mascarene Islands to the Seychelles, with a distinct eye in the center of the convection. The large wind field dropped heavy rainfall on Réunion to the south of the storm, reaching 393 mm (15.5 in) in the island's volcanic peaks. High waves over 4 m (13 ft) in height affected the island for a few days, which flooded a road and a hotel. The wind field extended far north to the Seychelles, dropping 159 mm (6.3 in) on Mahé island. On Tromelin Island, wind gusts reached 122 km/h (76 mph) while the storm passed nearby.

Moving west-southwestward toward northern Madagascar, Gafilo had outflow channels in three directions, an unusual but very favorable set of atmospheric conditions. The cyclone rapidly intensified beginning on March 5. At 12:00 UTC on March 6, the MFR estimated peak 10 minute winds of 230 km/h (140 mph), making Gafilo a very intense tropical cyclone. The agency also estimated a minimum pressure of 895 mbar (26.4 inHg), the lowest on record in the basin. Around the same time, the JTWC estimated peak 1 minute winds of 260 km/h (160 mph), equivalent to a Category 5 on the Saffir–Simpson scale. Gafilo weakened slightly due to an eyewall replacement cycle, but made landfall with much of its intensity just south of Antalaha in northeastern Madagascar around 00:00 UTC on March 7. One of the strongest cyclones on record to strike Madagascar, Gafilo wrecked 85% of the structures in Antalaha. According to the International Disaster Database, Gafilo killed 363 people in the country and left $250 million in damage (2004 USD). The cyclone struck the country less than two months after Cyclone Elita, resulting in additional losses for farmers of cloves, vanilla, and ylang-ylang. Nationwide, Gafilo destroyed over 20,000 homes, leaving 304,000 people homeless, more than half near Antalaha. The cyclone damaged or destroyed 3,400 schools and 413 public buildings. The large circulation produced hurricane-force winds along the west coast near Mahajanga, an unprecedented event for a storm striking the island's east coast. A boat capsized in Bombetoka Bay, killing at least seven people. The ferry Sansom, sailing from Comoros to Mahajanga with 120 people aboard, capsized amid high waves, with only three survivors.

The cyclone moved southwestward through the country, disrupting the inner convective core. The large dropped over 275 mm (10.8 in) of rainfall and produced 107 km/h (66 mph) winds on Mayotte. On March 8, Gafilo emerged into the Mozambique Channel, and soon after turned to the southeast, moving ashore southwestern Madagascar late on March 9 as a severe tropical storm. The storm meandered over southern Madagascar for three days before emerging off the island's east coast on March 13. Passing south of Réunion, Gafilo transitioned into a subtropical storm on March 14, before becoming an extratropical cyclone the next day. The storm turned back to the west, dissipating on March 18 south of Réunion.

=== Severe Tropical Storm Nicky–Helma ===
- Severe tropical storm (MFR)
- Category 1 tropical cyclone (SSHWS)
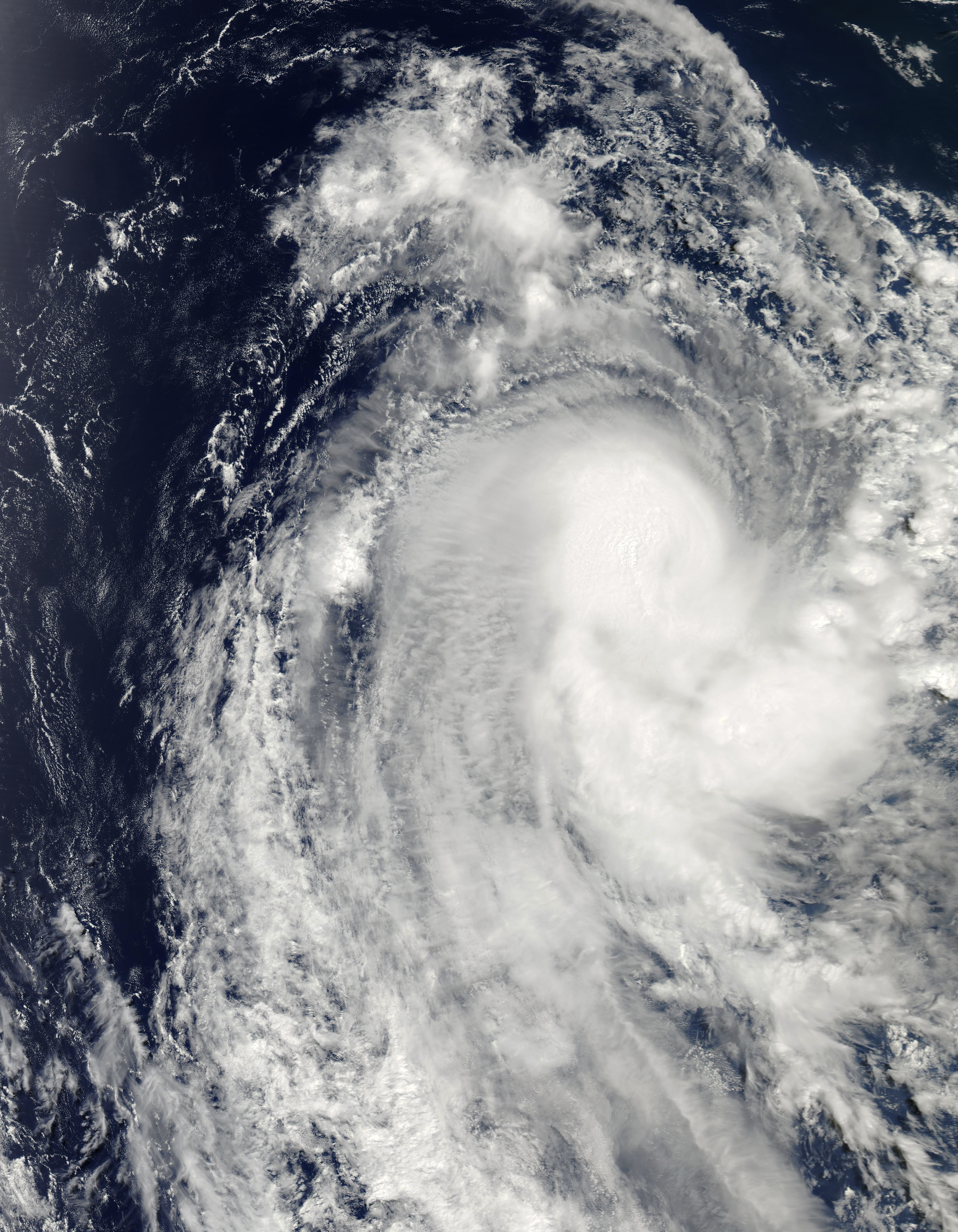
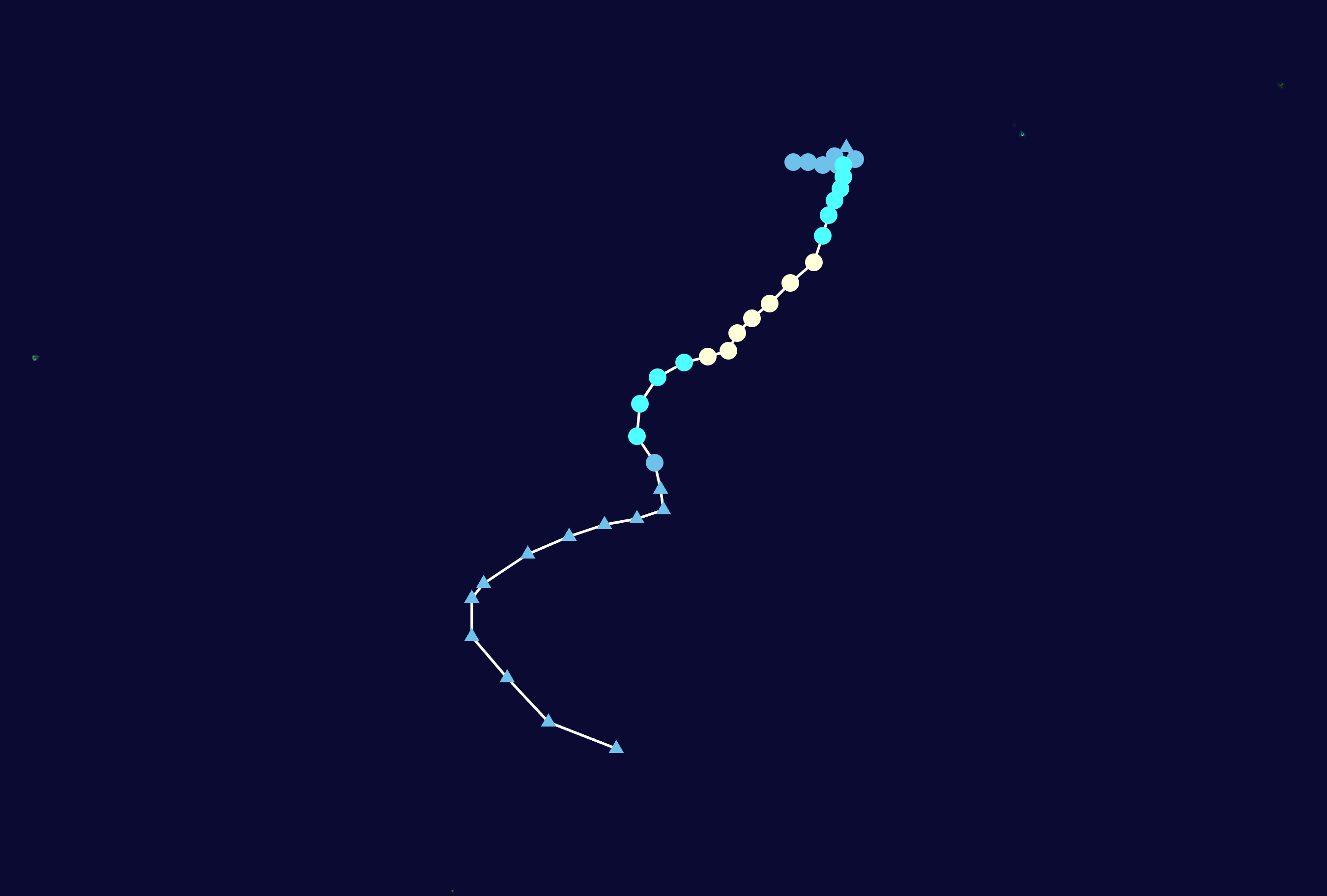
- Duration: March 10 (Entered basin) – March 16
- Peak intensity: 110 km/h (70 mph) (10-min); 975 hPa (mbar)

A weak low-pressure area was evident within the monsoon trough on March 2 in the eastern periphery of the basin. Thunderstorms fluctuated around a weak circulation, which crossed 90° E into the Australian basin on March 7. On the next day, the system became better organized, and the BoM designated it as a tropical low. Fueled by warm waters and moderate but decreasing wind shear, the low strengthened as it moved southwestward around a ridge. The BoM upgraded the low to Tropical Cyclone Nicky on March 9, well to the west of the Cocos Islands. On the next day, the storm crossed 90° E into the South-West Indian Ocean, whereupon it was renamed Helma.

A central dense overcast organized over Helma's center, briefly developing an eye feature on March 11. That day, the MFR estimated peak winds of 110 km/h (70 mph), making Helma a severe tropical storm. The JTWC, which designated the system Tropical Cyclone 17S, upgraded Helma to the equivalent of a minimal hurricane with peak winds of 120 km/h (75 mph). An approaching trough increased wind shear and caused the storm to weaken, leaving the center exposed by late on March 12. After turning to the south, Helma turned back to the southwest as a weakened depression, later turning to the southeast ahead of a cold front. The circulation dissipated on March 16 without affecting land.

=== Severe Tropical Storm Oscar–Itseng ===
- Severe tropical storm (MFR)
- Tropical storm (SSHWS)
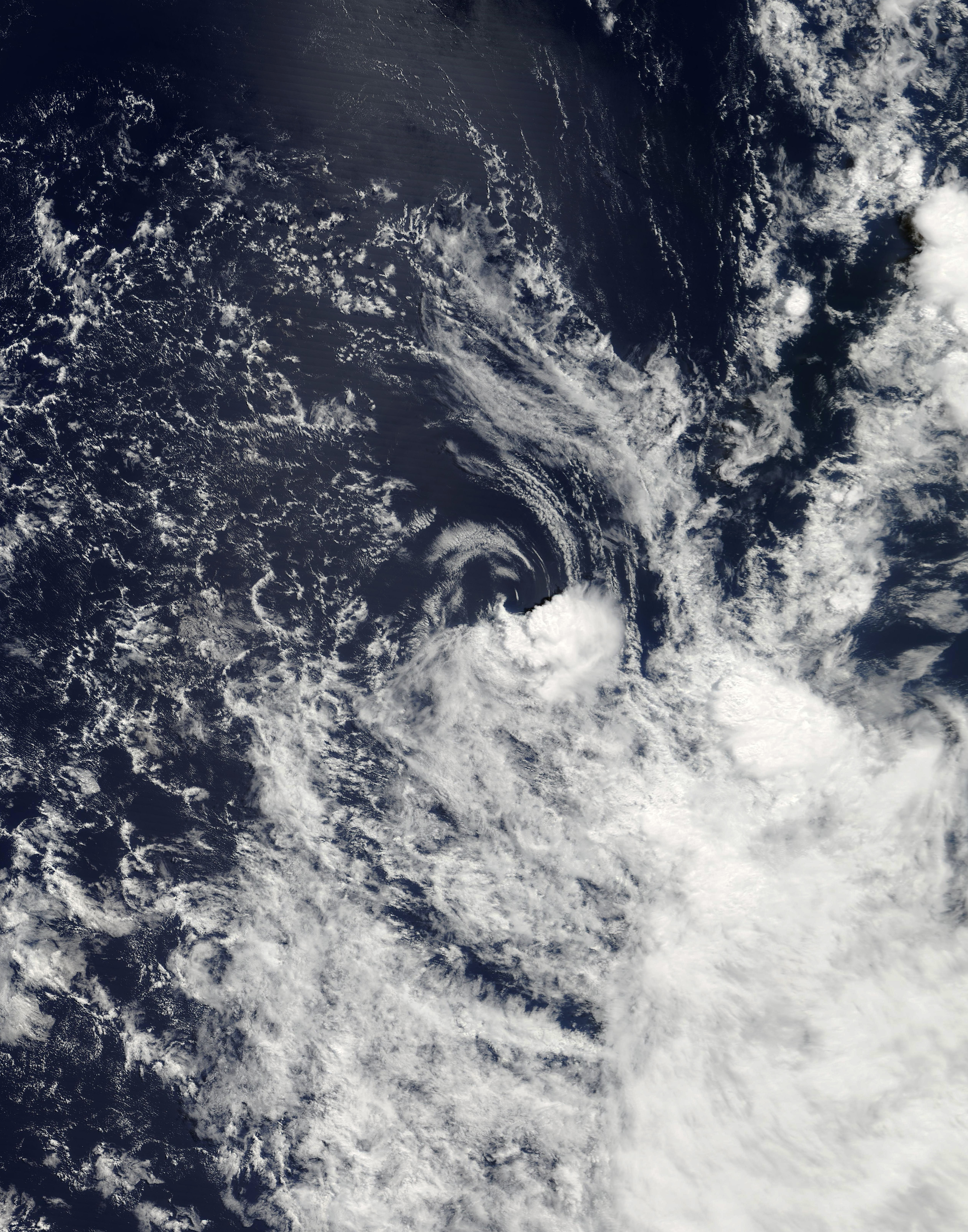
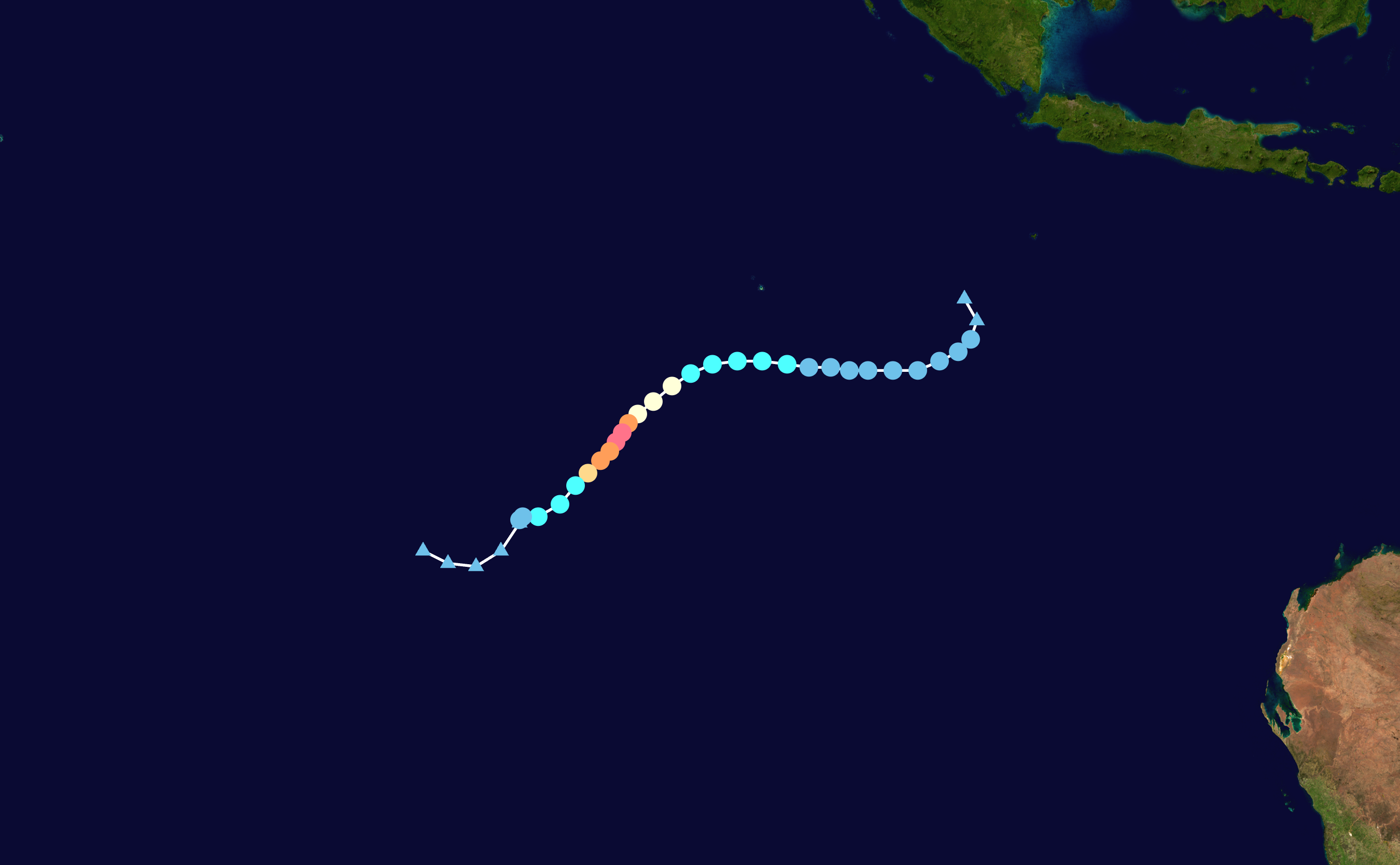
- Duration: March 27 (Entered basin) – March 29
- Peak intensity: 100 km/h (65 mph) (10-min); 980 hPa (mbar)

An active pulse in the MJO and a Rossby wave spawned Cyclone Fay and what would become Cyclone Oscar–Itseng in the Australian region. The origins of the latter storm were from a low-pressure area that developed southwest of Christmas Island on March 20. The BoM classified it as a tropical low on the next day. The system moved southward at first before beginning a westward trajectory. On March 23, the BoM upgraded the system to Tropical Cyclone Oscar south of the Cocos Islands, and the JTWC classified the storm as Tropical Cyclone 20S. An eye became established in the center of the convection, and the JTWC upgraded Oscar to the equivalent of hurricane status on March 25. On the next day, the agency estimated peak 1 minute winds of 215 km/h (135 mph), while the BoM estimated peak 10 minute winds of 165 km/h (105 mph).

Dry air and increased wind shear weakened the cyclone, leaving the circulation exposed from the convection. Late on March 27, Oscar crossed 90° E into the South-West Indian Ocean, whereupon it was renamed Itseng. Its peak intensity in the basin was 100 mph (160 km/h), according to the MFR. On March 28, the storm weakened into a tropical depression, and the JTWC discontinued advisories. A day later, the circulation turned to the west-northwest, steered by the ridge to the south. Late on March 29, Itseng dissipated without having affected land.

=== Severe Tropical Storm Juba ===
- Severe tropical storm (MFR)
- Category 1 tropical cyclone (SSHWS)
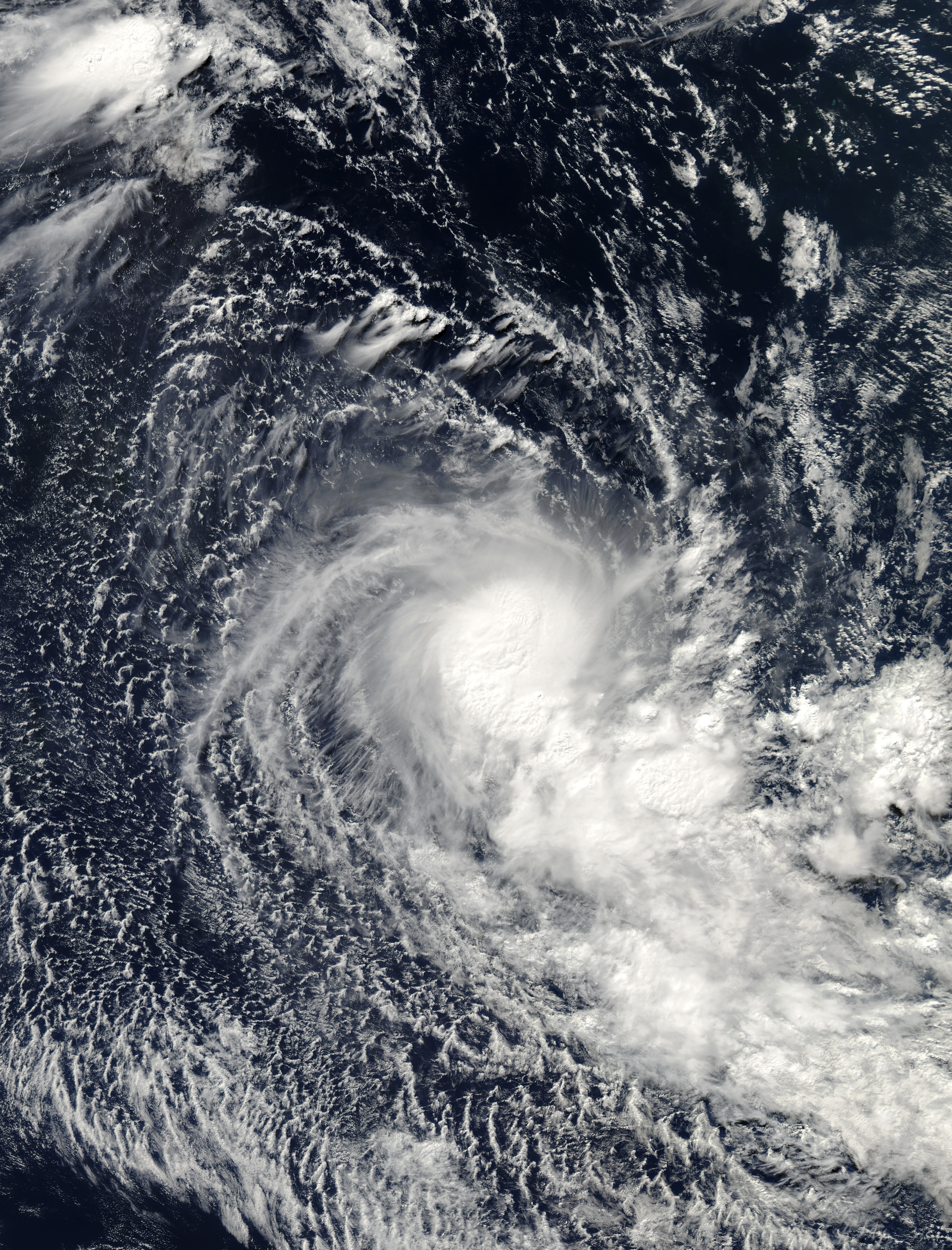
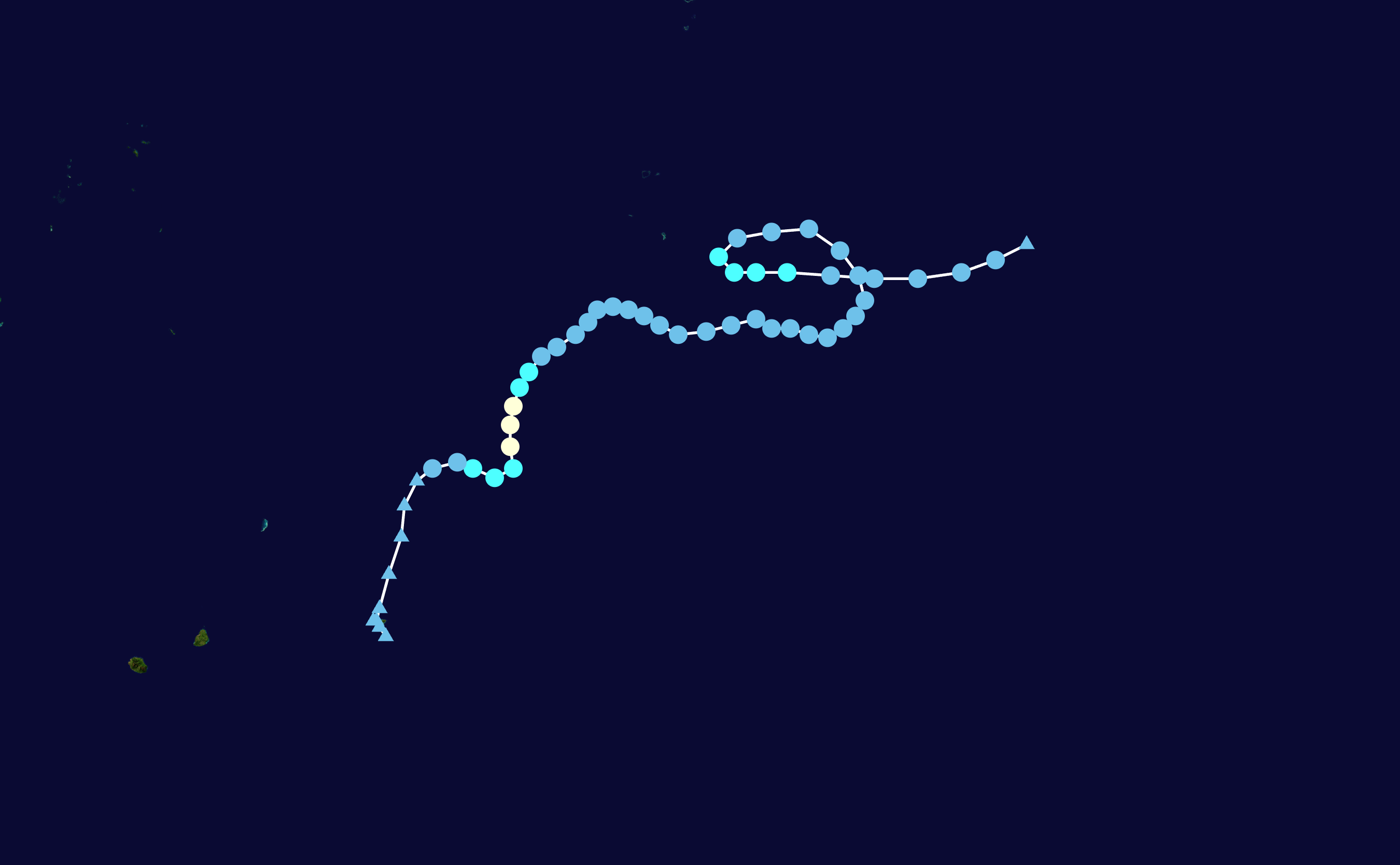
- Duration: May 5 – May 17
- Peak intensity: 100 km/h (65 mph) (10-min); 980 hPa (mbar)

In late April into early May, a westerly wind burst produced a large area of convection extending from southern India to the Chagos Archipelago. In the North Indian Ocean, the convection eventually organized into a tropical storm off the west coast of India. In the southern hemisphere, the convection was broad and had two weak circulations. One of the vortices dissipated on May 5, leaving the other center as the dominant system. Despite northeasterly wind shear, convection increased around this center enough for the MFR to designate it a tropical disturbance on May 5. On the same day, the JTWC designated the system as Tropical Cyclone 23S. For about a week, the disturbance meandered on a general westward trajectory without much development. During this time, the JTWC discontinued advisories after thunderstorms diminished. On May 11, the wind shear dropped, allowing convection to reorganize over the center. The storm began a southwest trajectory, and intensified into Moderate Tropical Storm Juba on May 12. Such storms in May are unusual, but Juba marked the third consecutive year that a May storm developed in the basin, after Manou in 2003 and Kesiny in 2002.

Moving due southward on May 13, Juba quickly intensified in an area of minimal wind shear and beneficial outflow. That day, the MFR upgraded Juba to a severe tropical storm, estimating peak 10 minute sustained winds of 100 km/h (60 mph). The JTWC estimated that the storm intensified to the equivalent of a minimal hurricane, with 1 minute winds of 120 km/h (75 mph). The wind shear increased on May 14, stripping the center of the deep convection. Later that day, the JTWC discontinued advisories. The MFR downgraded Juba to a tropical disturbance on May 15. The weak circulation turned to the south, passing just west of Rodrigues Island on May 16. There, the thunderstorms dropped 102 mm (4.0 in) of rainfall, which proved beneficial due to the island facing water shortages.

=== Other systems ===
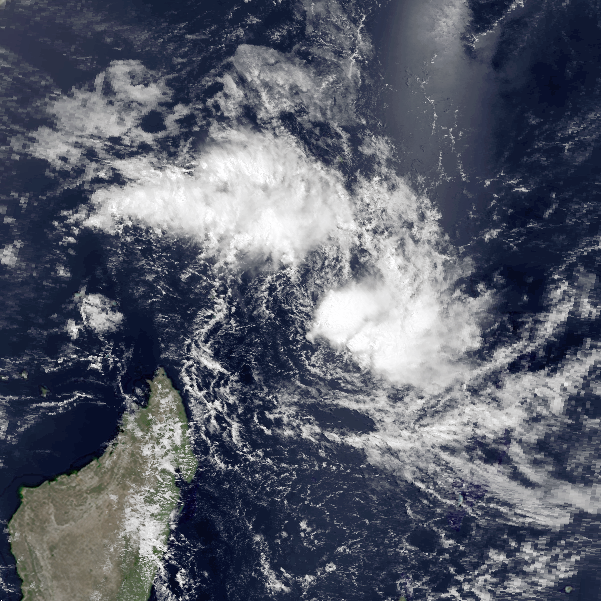
Satellite image of Tropical Disturbance 11 to the northeast of Madagascar in March

Toward the end of January, an area of convection extended from the coast of Africa. On January 22, the MFR designated the system as Zone of Disturbed Weather 05, after a circulation became present northeast of Madagascar. Unfavorable wind shear prevented development, and the MFR discontinued advisories on January 24. The same MJO pulse that spawned cyclones Elita and Frank also produced an area of convection in the eastern portion of the basin on January 27. A day later, the system organized enough for the MFR to designate it Tropical Disturbance 08. Soon after, the circulation moved southeastward, crossing 90º E into the neighboring Australian basin. There, the BoM tracked the storm, upgrading it to Tropical Cyclone Linda on January 30, and tracking it until February 1.

A low pressure moved westward from the Australian basin on March 15, potentially a continuation of Tropical Cyclone Evan which moved across Northern Australia in early March. The MFR designated the low as Tropical Disturbance 11, estimating peak winds of 45 km/h (30 mph). The agency discontinued advisories on March 21 while the disturbance was near Agaléga island. That day, convection increased over the circulation despite moderate wind shear. On March 23, the JTWC classified the system as Tropical Cyclone 21S, but the agency discontinued advisories on the next day. The MFR reissued advisories on March 25, following the weak system on a general westward trajectory until March 28 to the northeast of Madagascar. On March 31, the MFR briefly issued advisories on Tropical Disturbance 13 on a system east-southeast of Agaléga. With only pulsing thunderstorms, the system quickly weakened, and the agency ceased issuing advisories. The MFR also issued advisories for Zone of Disturbed Weather 14 on April 26 to the north-northeast of Mauritius, noting an area of thunderstorms and a poorly defined circulation. The system failed to develop further.

The final system of the year was Zone of Disturbed Weather 16, which originated east-northeast of Diego Garcia on May 19. The weak system moved to the west-southwest, and the MFR issued their last advisory on May 24.

== Storm names ==
A tropical disturbance is named when it reaches moderate tropical storm strength. If a tropical disturbance reaches moderate tropical storm status west of 55°E, then the Sub-regional Tropical Cyclone Advisory Centre in Madagascar assigns the appropriate name to the storm. If a tropical disturbance reaches moderate tropical storm status between 55°E and 90°E, then the Sub-regional Tropical Cyclone Advisory Centre in Mauritius assigns the appropriate name to the storm. A new annual list is used every year so no names are retired.

- Abaimba
- Beni
- Cela
- Darius
- Elita
- Frank
- Gafilo
- Helma
- Itseng
- Juba
- Katiba (unused)
- Lenny (unused)
- Moingaza (unused)
- Naledi (unused)
- Olie (unused)
- Patou (unused)
- Quilmane (unused)
- Ralph (unused)
- Sefate (unused)
- Tom (unused)
- Umuri (unused)
- Valletta (unused)
- Wells (unused)
- Xavier (unused)
- Yvonne (unused)
- Zuri (unused)

== Seasonal effects ==
This table lists all of the tropical cyclones and subtropical cyclones that were monitored during the 2003–2004 South-West Indian Ocean cyclone season. Information on their intensity, duration, name, areas affected, primarily comes from RSMC La Réunion. Death and damage reports come from either press reports or the relevant national disaster management agency while the damage totals are given in 2003 or 2004 USD.

Name	Dates	Peak intensity			Areas affected	Damage (USD)	Deaths	Ref(s).
Name	Dates	Category	Wind speed	Pressure	Areas affected	Damage (USD)	Deaths	Ref(s).
Abaimba	September 28 — October 6	Moderate tropical storm	80 km/h (50 mph)	995 hPa (29.38 inHg)	None	None	None	
Beni	November 9 – 25	Intense tropical cyclone	175 km/h (110 mph)	935 hPa (27.61 inHg)	Mascarene Islands, Réunion	None	None	
Cela	December 4 – 20	Tropical cyclone	120 km/h (75 mph)	975 hPa (28.79 inHg)	Madagascar, Juan de Nova Island	None	None	
Darius	December 27 – January 4	Severe tropical storm	100 km/h (60 mph)	980 hPa (28.94 inHg)	Mauritius	None	None	
05	January 22 – 24	Zone of disturbed weather	45 km/h (30 mph)	1,005 hPa (29.68 inHg)	None	None	None	
Elita	January 24 – February 4	Tropical cyclone	120 km/h (75 mph)	970 hPa (28.64 inHg)	Madagascar, Mozambique, Malawi, Seychelles, Mauritius, Réunion	Unknown	33	
Frank	January 26 – February 6	Intense tropical cyclone	185 km/h (115 mph)	930 hPa (27.46 inHg)	None	None	None	
08	January 28	Tropical disturbance	45 km/h (30 mph)	1,002 hPa (29.59 inHg)	None	None	None	
Gafilo	March 1 – 15	Very intense tropical cyclone	230 km/h (145 mph)	895 hPa (26.43 inHg)	Madagascar, La Réunion, Seychelles, Tromelin Island,	$250 million	363	
Nicky–Helma	March 10 – 16	Severe tropical storm	110 km/h (70 mph)	980 hPa (28.94 inHg)	None	None	None	
11	March 15 – 28	Tropical disturbance	45 km/h (30 mph)	1,002 hPa (29.59 inHg)	Agaléga	None	None	
Oscar–Itseng	March 27 – 29	Severe tropical storm	100 km/h (60 mph)	980 hPa (28.94 inHg)	None	None	None	
13	March 31 – April 1	Tropical disturbance	45 km/h (30 mph)	1,003 hPa (29.62 inHg)	None	None	None	
14	April 26 – 27	Zone of disturbed weather	45 km/h (30 mph)	1,001 hPa (29.56 inHg)	None	None	None	
Juba	May 5 — 15, 2004	Severe tropical storm	100 km/h (65 mph)	975 hPa (28.79 inHg)	None	None	None	
Sixteen	May 19 — 24, 2004	Zone of disturbed weather	35 km/h (25 mph)	Not specified	None	None	None	
Season aggregates
16 systems	September 28 – May 24		230 km/h (145 mph)	895 hPa (26.43 inHg)		$250 million	396	

== See also ==
- Tropical cyclones in 2004
- List of Southern Hemisphere tropical cyclone seasons
- Atlantic hurricane seasons: 2003, 2004
- Pacific hurricane seasons: 2003, 2004
- Pacific typhoon seasons: 2003, 2004
- North Indian Ocean cyclone seasons: 2003, 2004
