= Mozambique National Institute of Meteorology =

- Instituto Nacional de Meteorologia de Moçambique

Agency overview
- Jurisdiction: Government
- Headquarters: Maputo
- Employees: 64(2020)
- Annual budget: MZN 65, 223, 850(2020)
- Parent department: Ministry of Transport and Communications

The Mozambique National Institute of Meteorology (Portuguese: Instituto Nacional de Meteorologia de Moçambique) is the national meteorological organization of Mozambique.

It is responsible for monitoring weather in the country and for providing warning of imminent tropical storms or meteorological changes that could potentially threaten the country. For instance when Cyclone Elita struck the south-eastern African coast in 2004, the Mozambique National Institute of Meteorology advised people living in Nampula, Zambezia, Sofala, and Inhambane Provinces to make preparations for strong winds and rainfall.

The headquarters are in the capital of Maputo. As of 2020, the institute employed 64 people and had an annual budget of MZN 65,223,850.
