= Afghanistan Meteorological Authority =

Government agency of Afghanistan

- Dari: ریاست هوا شناسی

Agency overview
- Formed: 1955; 71 years ago
- Jurisdiction: Government of Afghanistan
- Headquarters: Kabul, Afghanistan
- Parent department: Afghanistan Civil Aviation Authority
- Website: www.amd.gov.af

The Afghanistan Meteorological Authority (Pashto: د افغانستان د هوا پېژندنې اداره), also referred to as the Afghanistan Meteorological Department, is located in Kabul, Afghanistan. The agency operates under the Afghanistan Civil Aviation Authority and is led by Abdul Qadeer.

== History ==
During the Soviet occupation of Afghanistan, the Afghanistan Meteorological Authority had one of the most advanced weather stations available at the time and a staff of 600.

=== First Taliban Regime ===
In 1996, Taliban forces sacked its office because weather forecasting had been banned as it was considered to be sorcery. Equipment was ruined and over 100 years worth of weather records were destroyed. During that time, only real-time observers remained on staff. Because of the ban, farmers were harmed because drought information and forecasting could not take place. In 1998, an Ariana Afghan Airlines flight flew into unexpected weather, causing it to crash into a mountain, killing 45 people.

=== Recovery ===
In 2003, France financed the installation of over a dozen simple weather stations around Afghanistan. The stations provide basic information such as temperature, barometric pressure, and rainfall. Also in 2003, the World Meteorological Organization in Geneva provided the Authority with copies of its lost records.

Canadian troops at Camp Julien assisted in collecting data by launching weather balloons twice a day. The data was primarily for NATO and the armies of the U.S. and Germany, but was shared with the AMA as well. In 2016, weather balloon launches at Kabul International Airport were done by contract and NATO meteorologists on the NATO side of the complex. NATO had a Combined Meteorological Unit staffed by a Romanian Officer in Charge, Czech Republic military, and U.S. and Turkish contractors. With the aim of providing full services while the Afghans were trained to take over operations.
