= EGOWS =

EGOWS (European Working Group on Operational [Meteorological] Workstations) is a collaboration forum for European NMS (National Meteorological Services) in the field of workstations for duty forecasters. A three or four-day meeting is held every year, since 1990. Despite its name through time, EGOWS has also included non-European members.

== EGOWS Virtual Meetings ==
At the 2019 EGOWS meeting, it was decided to supplement the annual meetings with a series of virtual meetings in order to have more frequent discussions with no travel cost.

- 1st Virtual EGOWS on Exchange of Time Series Data hosted by ECMWF, UK, 26 February 2020

== EGOWS Annual Meetings 1990– ==
- 30th EGOWS in De Bilt at KNMI, Netherlands, 12-14 Nov 2019
- 29th EGOWS in Reading at ECMWF, UK, 15–17 October 2018
- 28th EGOWS in Bratislava at SHMU, Slovakia, 30 May - 1 June 2017
- 27th EGOWS in Helsinki at FMI, Finland, 20–22 September 2016
- 26th EGOWS in Reading at ECMWF, UK, 29 Sep - 1 Oct 2015
- 25th EGOWS in Oslo, Norway, June 2–5, 2014
- 24th EGOWS in Offenbach am Main, Germany, June 11–13, 2013
- 23rd EGOWS in Exeter, United Kingdom 2012
- 22nd EGOWS in Toulouse, France 2011
- 21st EGOWS in Reading, UK 2010
- 20th EGOWS in De Bilt, Netherlands 2009
- 19th EGOWS in Ljubljana, Slovenia 2008
- 18th EGOWS in Dublin, Ireland 2007
- 17th EGOWS in Budapest, Hungary 2006
- 16th EGOWS in Exeter, United Kingdom 2005
- 15th EGOWS in Potsdam, Germany 2004
- 14th EGOWS in Tromsø, Norway 2003 pdf, 59,4 Mb
- 13th EGOWS in Rome, Italy 2002
- 12th EGOWS in Zürich, Switzerland 2001 pdf, 17.9 mb
- 11th EGOWS in Helsinki, Finland 2000 pdf, 10.9 mb
- 10th EGOWS in De Bilt, Netherlands 1999 pdf, 14.3 mb
- 9th EGOWS in Norrköping, Sweden 1998 pdf, 13.5 mb
- 8th EGOWS in Toulouse, France 1997 pdf, 12.0 mb
- 7th EGOWS in Reading, United Kingdom 1996 pdf, 6.6 mb
- 6th EGOWS in Vienna, Austria 1995 pdf, 10.8 mb
- 5th EGOWS in Copenhagen, Denmark 1994 pdf, 3.8 mb
- 4th EGOWS in Offenbach, Germany 1993 pdf, 3.7 mb
- 3rd EGOWS in Helsinki, Finland 1992 pdf, 2.8 mb
- 2nd EGOWS in Paris, France 1991 pdf, 2.1 mb
- 1st EGOWS in Oslo, Norway 1990 pdf, 0.8 mb
