= Ksar Chellala =

Coordinates: 35°13′N 2°19′E

- Commune and town
- Interactive map of Ksar Chellala
- Country: Algeria
- Province: Ksar Chellala Province

Population (2008)
  - Total: 52 753
- Time zone: UTC+1 (CET)
- Postal code: 14300
- Area code: 046

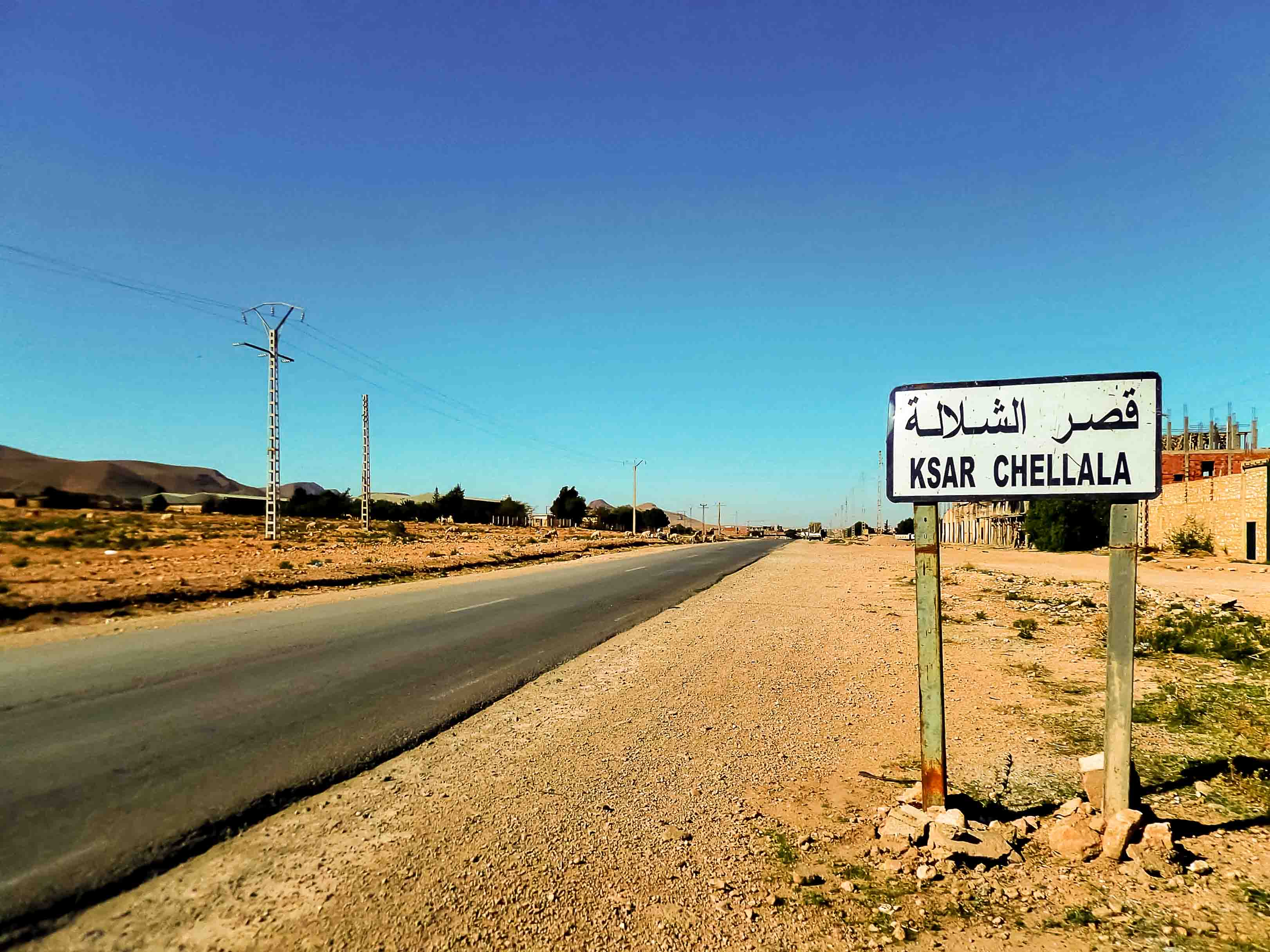
entrance to Ksar Chellala, road to Hmmama Serguine, wilaya of Tiaret

Ksar Chellala is a town and commune in Ksar Chelalla Province in northwestern Algeria.
