= 2015–16 Southern Hemisphere tropical cyclone season =

The 2015–16 Southern Hemisphere tropical cyclone season may refer to one of three different basins and respective seasons:

- 2015–16 South-West Indian Ocean cyclone season, west of 90°E
- 2015–16 Australian region cyclone season, between 90°E and 160°E
- 2015–16 South Pacific cyclone season, east of 160°E

Two South Atlantic tropical cyclones formed during this time period, Subtropical Storm Deni and Eçaí
