= Cyclone Fantala =

South-West Indian Ocean cyclone in 2016

Very Intense Tropical Cyclone Fantala
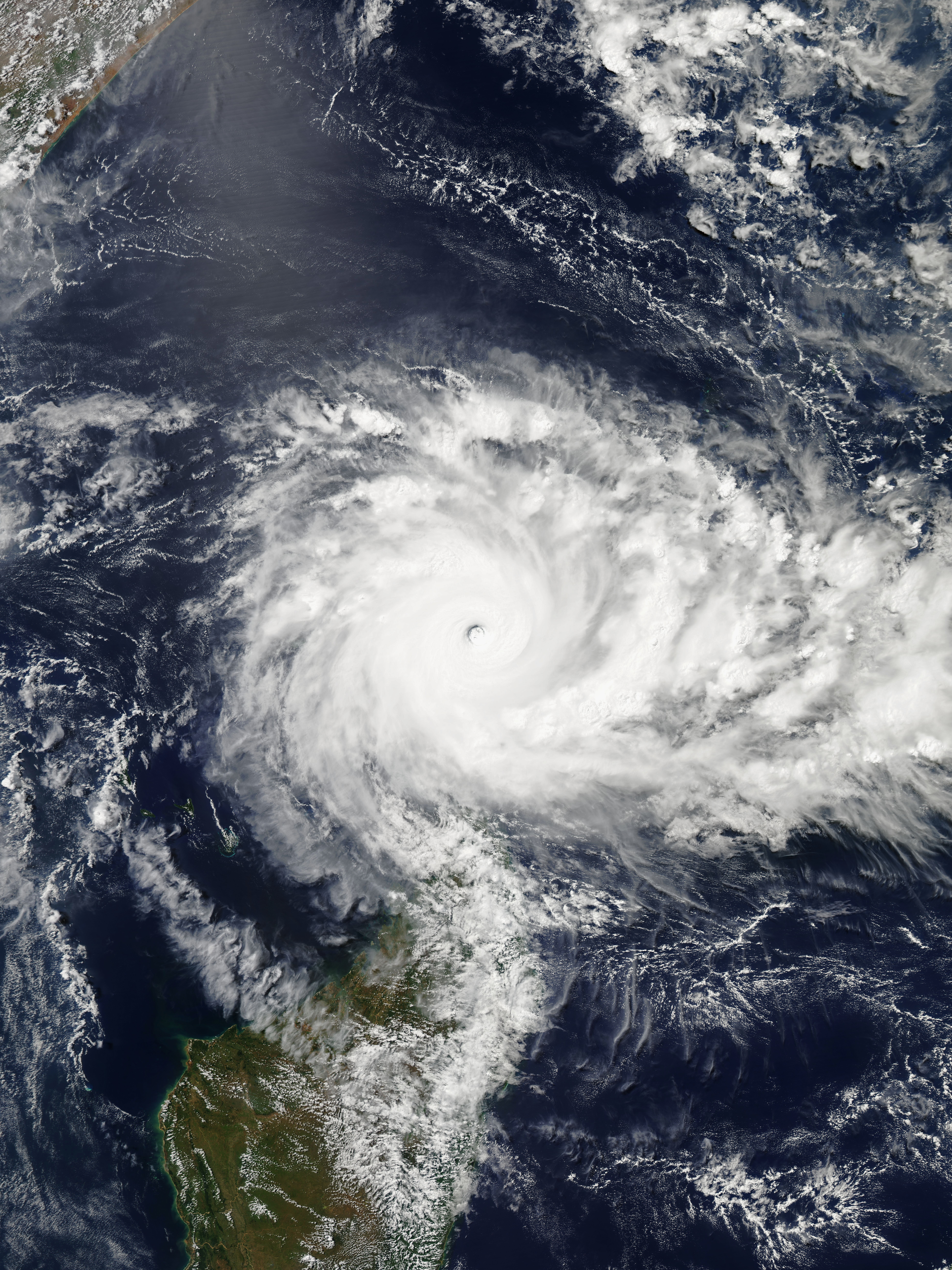
- Cyclone Fantala north of Madagascar on 18 April, shortly after peak intensity

Meteorological history
- Formed: 11 April 2016
- Remnant low: 23 April 2016
- Dissipated: 27 April 2016

Very intense tropical cyclone
- 10-minute sustained (MFR)
- Highest winds: 250 km/h (155 mph)
- Highest gusts: 350 km/h (220 mph)
- Lowest pressure: 910 hPa (mbar); 26.87 inHg

Category 5-equivalent tropical cyclone
- 1-minute sustained (SSHWS/JTWC)
- Highest winds: 285 km/h (180 mph)
- Lowest pressure: 907 hPa (mbar); 26.78 inHg

Overall effects
- Fatalities: 13 total
- Damage: $4.5 million (2016 USD)
- Areas affected: Agaléga; Seychelles; Madagascar; Tanzania
- IBTrACS /
- Part of the 2015–16 South-West Indian Ocean cyclone season

Very Intense Tropical Cyclone Fantala was the most intense tropical cyclone recorded in the South-West Indian Ocean in terms of both 10 and 1-minute maximum sustained winds. Part of the 2015–16 cyclone season, Fantala formed on 11 April to the south of Diego Garcia, an island in the central Indian Ocean. With a ridge to the south, the storm moved westward for several days while gaining strength, aided by warm waters and decreasing wind shear. Late on 17 April, the Météo-France office on Réunion (MFR) estimated peak 10-minute winds of 250 km/h (155 mph), making Fantala the strongest tropical cyclone of the basin in terms of 10-minute sustained winds. The Joint Typhoon Warning Center (JTWC) estimated peak 1-minute winds of 285 km/h (180 mph), equivalent to Category 5 intensity on the Saffir-Simpson scale, also the strongest on record in the South-West Indian Ocean, in terms of maximum sustained wind speed. Early on 18 April, Fantala reached its peak intensity, with a minimum central pressure of 910 millibars (27 inHg).

While near peak intensity, Fantala passed near the Farquhar Group of the Seychelles, damaging most of the buildings in the small archipelago. Later on 18 April, Fantala had weakened to an intense tropical cyclone and slowed its forward motion, eventually reversing its direction of movement. After fluctuating in strength, the disorganized system reversed direction again, making its closest approach to Madagascar. Fantala degenerated into a remnant low on 24 April, and the remnants continued toward Tanzania. There, heavy rainfall resulted in flooding that washed away roads and houses, killing 13 people. Rains extended further into Kenya, with similar effects.

== Meteorological history ==
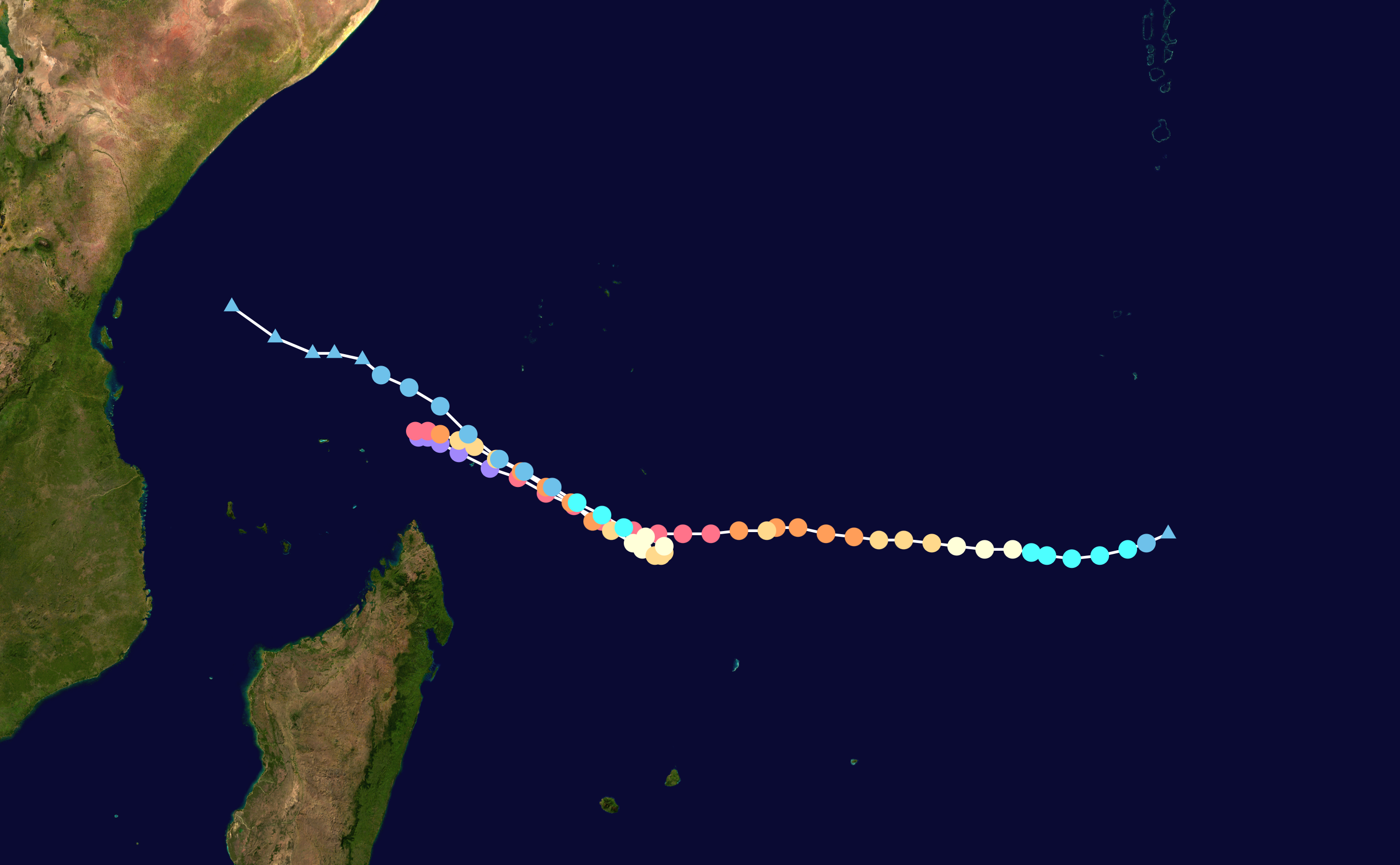
Map plotting the storm's track and intensity, according to the Saffir–Simpson scale Map key Saffir–Simpson scale Tropical depression (≤38 mph, ≤62 km/h) Tropical storm (39–73 mph, 63–118 km/h) Category 1 (74–95 mph, 119–153 km/h) Category 2 (96–110 mph, 154–177 km/h) Category 3 (111–129 mph, 178–208 km/h) Category 4 (130–156 mph, 209–251 km/h) Category 5 (≥157 mph, ≥252 km/h) Unknown Storm type Tropical cyclone Subtropical cyclone Extratropical cyclone, remnant low, tropical disturbance, or monsoon depression

On 9 April, an area of disturbed weather persisted to the southeast of Diego Garcia. The system moved generally westward, steered by a ridge, and a low-level circulation gradually became more defined. Limiting factors to faster development included poor inflow and moderate wind shear, although associated convection became more organized. At 06:00 UTC on 11 April, the Regional Specialized Meteorological Center Météo-France in La Réunion (MFR) classified the system as Tropical Disturbance 8 about 600 km (370 mi) south of Diego Garcia. Six hours later, the agency upgraded the system to a tropical depression. At 13:00 UTC on 11 April, the American-based Joint Typhoon Warning Center (JTWC) issued a tropical cyclone formation alert, noting the increased organization of the convection, circulation, and outflow. Later that day, the MFR upgraded the depression to Moderate Tropical Storm Fantala, and the JTWC classified it as Tropical Cyclone 19S. By that time, the convection was quickly consolidating around the center, organizing into a circular central dense overcast.

On 12 April, the previously detrimental wind shear began easing, allowing the structure to become more symmetric. On that day, an eye feature began developing in the center of Fantala, indicative of strengthening. At 12:00 UTC on 12 April, the MFR upgraded Fantala to severe tropical storm status, and six hours later, the JTWC upgraded it to the equivalent of a minimal hurricane, with 1 minute maximum sustained winds of 120 km/h (75 mph); rapid strengthening was prevented by the entrainment of nearby dry air, although the core of convection continued to contract. At 06:00 UTC on 13 April, the MFR upgraded Fantala to tropical cyclone status, with 10 minute winds of 130 km/h (80 mph). By that time, the eye feature persisted, consisting of a warm area within the deepest convection, although the dry air in the region prevented quicker strengthening.

By early on 14 April, the eye became better defined after an eyewall replacement cycle. The intensity fluctuated after outflow decreased to the north, although increasingly warm waters favored further intensification. Early on 15 April, the MFR upgraded Fantala to an intense tropical cyclone, as the storm rapidly deepened. The outflow was enhanced by a large upper-level low well to the southeast, and shear had decreased to a minimum. After reaching an initial peak intensity with 10-minute sustained winds of 205 km/h (125 mph) at 12:00 UTC that day, Fantala's intensity leveled off for the following 48 hours, with its 10-minute sustained winds fluctuating between 195 and 215 km/h (120 and 130 mph).

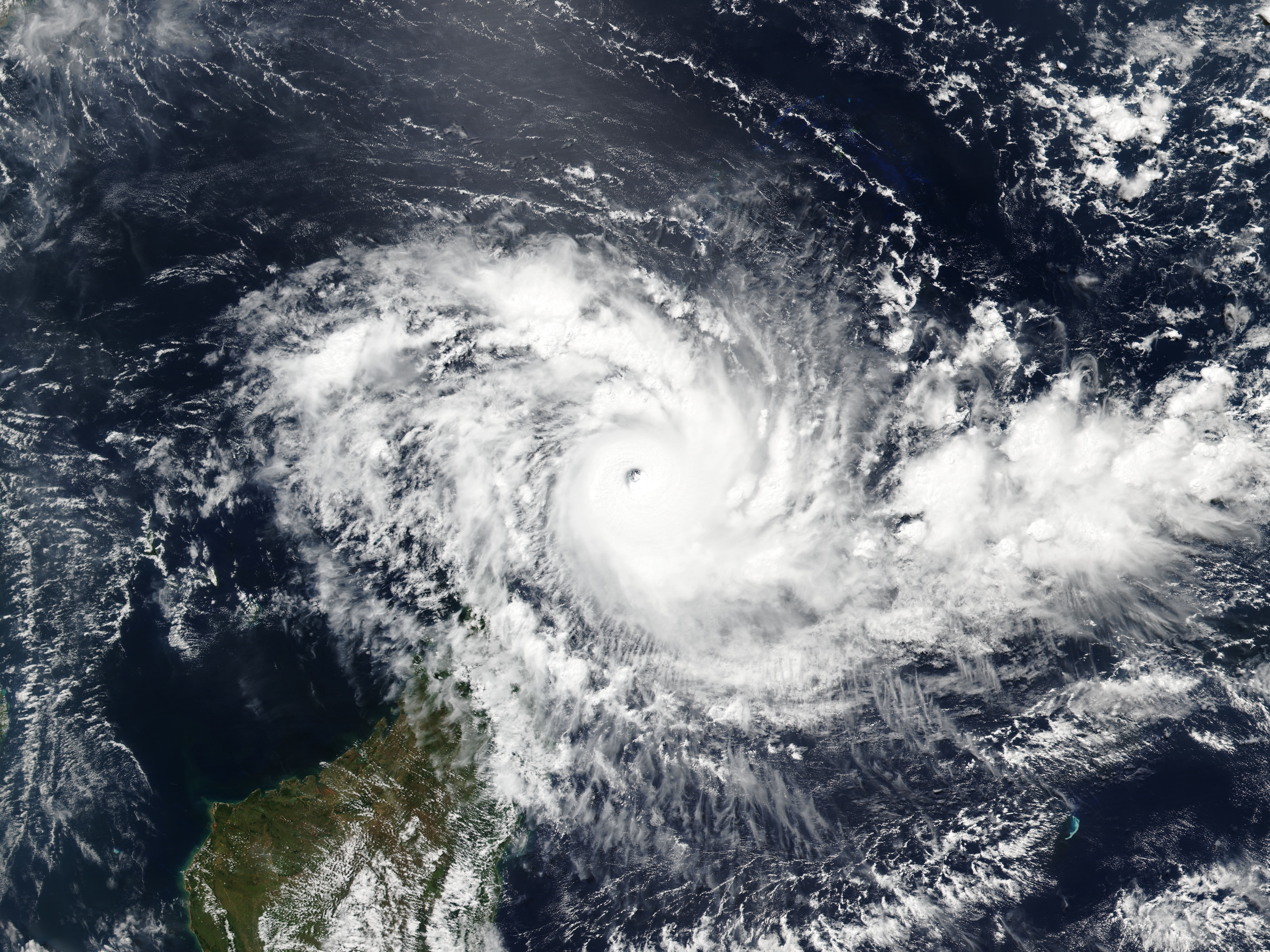
Fantala to the north of Madagascar, while nearing peak intensity on 17 April

On 16 April, Fantala turned more to the west-northward toward the southern islands of the Seychelles, steered by a strengthening ridge near Madagascar. Intensification resumed by 12:00 UTC on the following day, with the JTWC estimating 1-minute sustained winds of 270 km/h (165 mph), classifying Fantala as a Category 5-equivalent tropical cyclone on the Saffir-Simpson scale. Around 15:00 UTC, the cyclone moved through the Farquhar Group of the Seychelles, and its eyewall moved over several small islands. At 18:00 UTC on 17 April, the MFR upgraded Fantala to a very intense tropical cyclone; based on a Dvorak T-number of T7.5, the satellite-derived wind estimate was 10-minute sustained winds of 250 km/h (155 mph), along with an estimated barometric pressure of 910 mbar (910.0 hPa; 26.87 inHg). However, in the best track for Fantala, the MFR concluded that Fantala had been a very intense tropical cyclone 6 hours earlier as well, with 10-minute sustained winds of 220 km/h (140 mph), and that the storm's peak intensity and minimum central pressure of 910 mbar (910 hPa; 27 inHg) had occurred 18 hours after that time, at 06:00 UTC on 18 April. The JTWC also estimated peak 1-minute sustained winds of 285 km/h (180 mph).

While maintaining peak intensity, Fantala's forward movement slowed as the ridge to its south over Madagascar weakened. The cyclone turned back to the southeast due to the building influence of a ridge to the northeast, and the storm retraced its former path. Cooler waters along its path – the result of upwelling – as well as another eyewall replacement cycle, caused Fantala to weaken to an intense tropical cyclone by 19 April. Fantala had maintained at least Category 4-equivalent intensity for about 90 hours, and of those 90 hours, Fantala spent about 30 hours at both very intense tropical cyclone status and Category 5-equivalent intensity. That day, the eye disappeared on satellite imagery and the storm deteriorated further to tropical cyclone status. The eye redeveloped on 20 April, with pronounced outflow assisting in the re-intensification, although increased shear resulted in weakening again on 21 April. That day, the MFR downgraded Fantala to a severe tropical storm. The structure improved again on 22 April as the system stalled due to the building ridge to the south. At 00:00 UTC that day, the MFR upgraded Fantala to an intense tropical cyclone once the eye became more pronounced again, only to downgrade it to tropical cyclone status by 06:00 UTC, though this was pushed back to 12:00 UTC in the best track. A small area of convection persisted over the center, although dry air in the region continued to weaken the thunderstorms.

The MFR again downgraded Fantala to a severe tropical storm on 23 April, as the storm began drifting to the northwest. Increasing wind shear weakened Fantala further to a moderate tropical storm that day, and on 24 April, both the JTWC and MFR issued their final advisories; the latter agency had first downgraded it to a tropical depression. By that time, the circulation was exposed from the convection as Fantala moved over cooled waters where it traversed a few days prior. The circulation continued to the northwest, with occasional flares of convection. By 27 April, a circulation was no longer present as the convective remnants of Fantala approached the coastline of Tanzania.

== Preparations and impact ==
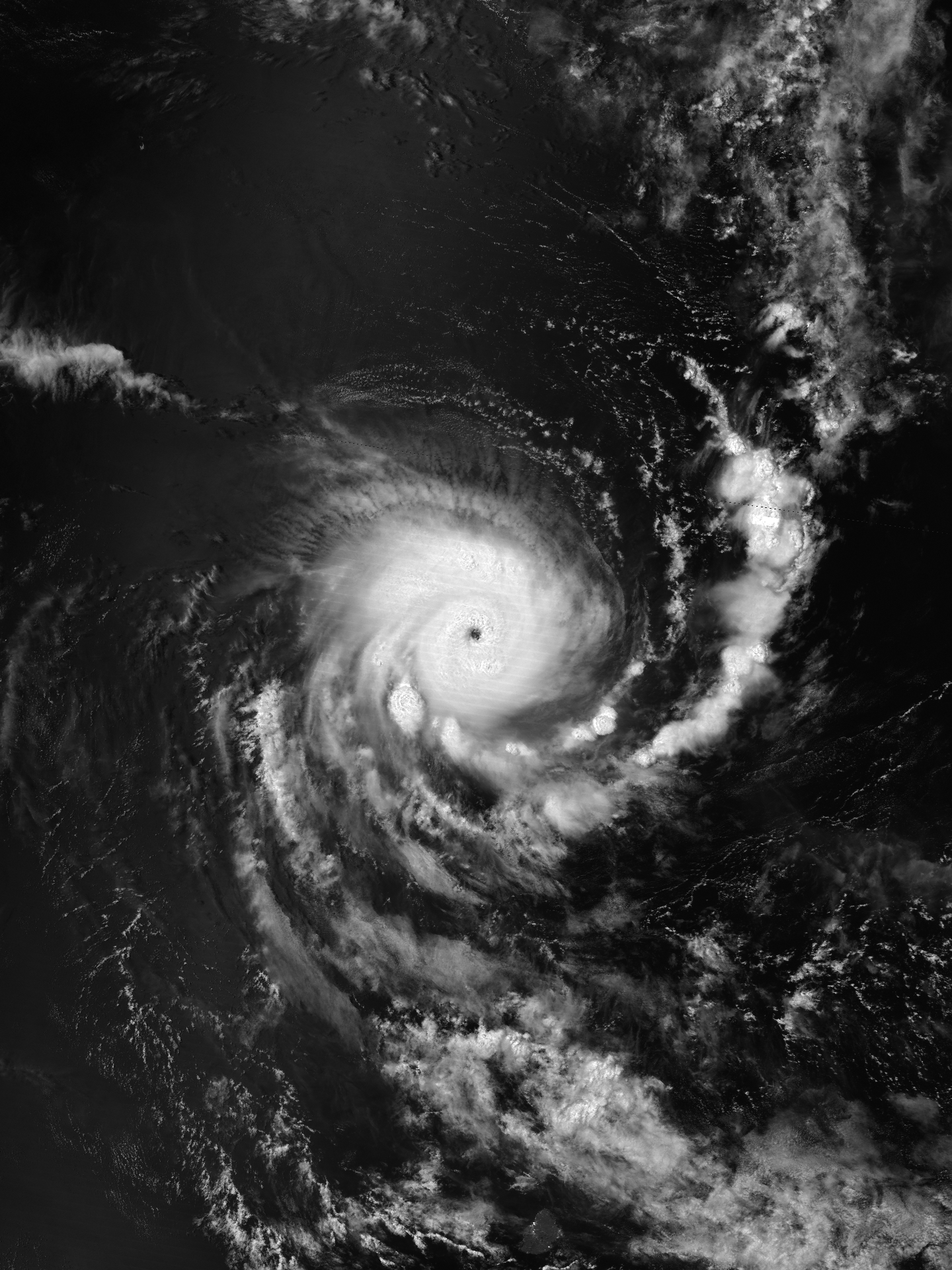
Fantala near its secondary peak intensity late on 21 April

Cyclone Fantala first threatened Agaléga, part of the Outer Islands of Mauritius. Government officials forced all 72 residents on the South Island to evacuate to the North Island, and strongly advised fishermen to avoid sailing.

Fantala was the first tropical cyclone to threaten the Farquhar Group since Cyclone Bondo in 2006. Most of the 34 residents on Farquhar Atoll evacuated ahead of the storm, and those that remained behind were uninjured. While moving through the Seychelles near peak intensity, Fantala had estimated 10-minute sustained winds of 250 km/h (160 mph), and days later it moved through the region again with 10-minute sustained winds estimated at 130 km/h (81 mph). Based on satellite imagery, it was estimated that of the 50 structures on Farquhar Atoll, 19 were destroyed and 27 sustained severe damage. Only four buildings, which were constructed to be cyclone-proof after Bondo, withstood the estimated 350 km/h (220 mph) gusts, even then suffering moderate damage. In addition, many of the island's trees were knocked down. Due to the storm's prolonged passage through the island group, the Seychelles government declared the Farquhar islands as a disaster area on 20 April. In a visit to the Seychelles, United Nations Secretary-General Ban Ki-moon stated that the country has become "highly vulnerable to storm surges, as we are reminded by the recent devastating effects of Cyclone Fantala." A World Bank survey team found $4.5 million in damage. The lodge on the island was not expected to be rebuilt until March 2017, about 11 months after the storm. In April 2017, the development of two new islands in Farquhar's lagoon was attributed to the cyclone.

The remnants of Fantala spurred warnings from the Tanzania Meteorological Agency after the storm produced heavy rainfall. In Kilimanjaro Region, the rains caused flooding that covered roads and entered houses, trapping hundreds of residents and killing eight. Officials required helicopters from nearby Kilimanjaro National Park to rescue residents. Five people were killed in the country's Morogoro Region, all drowning in flooded rivers. The overflowing Umba River isolated several villages. In the region, 13,933 people were left homeless after 315 houses were washed away. Flooding also washed away 12,073 ha (29,830 acres) of crop fields, prompting officials to purchase and distribute maize, beans, and cooking oil to affected residents. The storm also sent a plume of moisture northward to Kenya, where storm-influenced rainfall reached 133 mm (5.2 in) in Kwale in just four hours. This resulted in flooding in coastal portions of Kenya that destroyed several houses. About 10,000 ha (25,000 acres) of crop fields were flooded. The port and several roads were closed in the city of Mombasa, Kenya's second-largest city.

== Records ==
The MFR's estimate of peak 10-minute sustained winds of 250 km/h (155 mph) made Fantala the strongest tropical cyclone on record in the south-west Indian Ocean by that measure. According to estimates from the JTWC, Fantala attained peak 1-minute sustained winds of 285 km/h (180 mph), surpassing Cyclone Agnielle from November 1995 as the strongest cyclone on record in the south-west Indian Ocean. Reliable satellite-based intensity estimates date back to 1990. The storm was fueled by the powerful 2014–16 El Niño event, which also contributed to the record intensities of Hurricane Patricia in the northeastern Pacific Ocean, as well as Cyclone Pam and Cyclone Winston in the southern Pacific Ocean. Cyclone Fantala had an accumulated cyclone energy (ACE) of 53, which was the highest in the Southern Hemisphere until Cyclone Freddy in 2023.

== See also ==
- Derrick's sandbank
- Weather of 2016
- Tropical cyclones in 2016
- Cyclone Gafilo (2004) – Most intense storm on record in the South-West Indian Ocean basin
- Cyclone Bejisa (2013) – Most recent storm to affect the Seychelles before Fantala
- Cyclone Ambali (2019) – A very intense tropical cyclone formed in December 2019
- Cyclone Faraji (2021) – Another intense tropical cyclone that formed in February 2021
- Cyclone Freddy (2023) – Another intense and long-lived tropical cyclone that formed in February 2023
