= Derrick's sandbank =

Sandbank in Seychelles

Coordinates: 10°14′43.62″S 51°04′19.57″E

Derrick's sandbank is an island in the Seychelles that emerged following a cyclone in 2016. Its surface area expanded over the following years to reach nearly 8 hectares.

== Geography ==
The island is located in the Farquhar Group, which is part of the Outer Islands of the Seychelles. It is a sandbank whose surface and vegetation are growing. Its emergence is occurring in the context of coastal erosion in the archipelago and the destruction of coral reefs due to climate change.

== History ==
Derrick's sandbank appeared following Cyclone Fantala, which struck the region in mid-April 2016. Its initial area was 0.3 hectares, and it wasn't until 2019 that its elevation was consistently higher than the high tide level. Its permanence was also confirmed by the colonisation of shrubs and birds. A study conducted in 2023 showed that the area had increased to 7.8 hectares.
