= Cyclone Gafilo =

South-West Indian cyclone in 2004

Very Intense Tropical Cyclone Gafilo
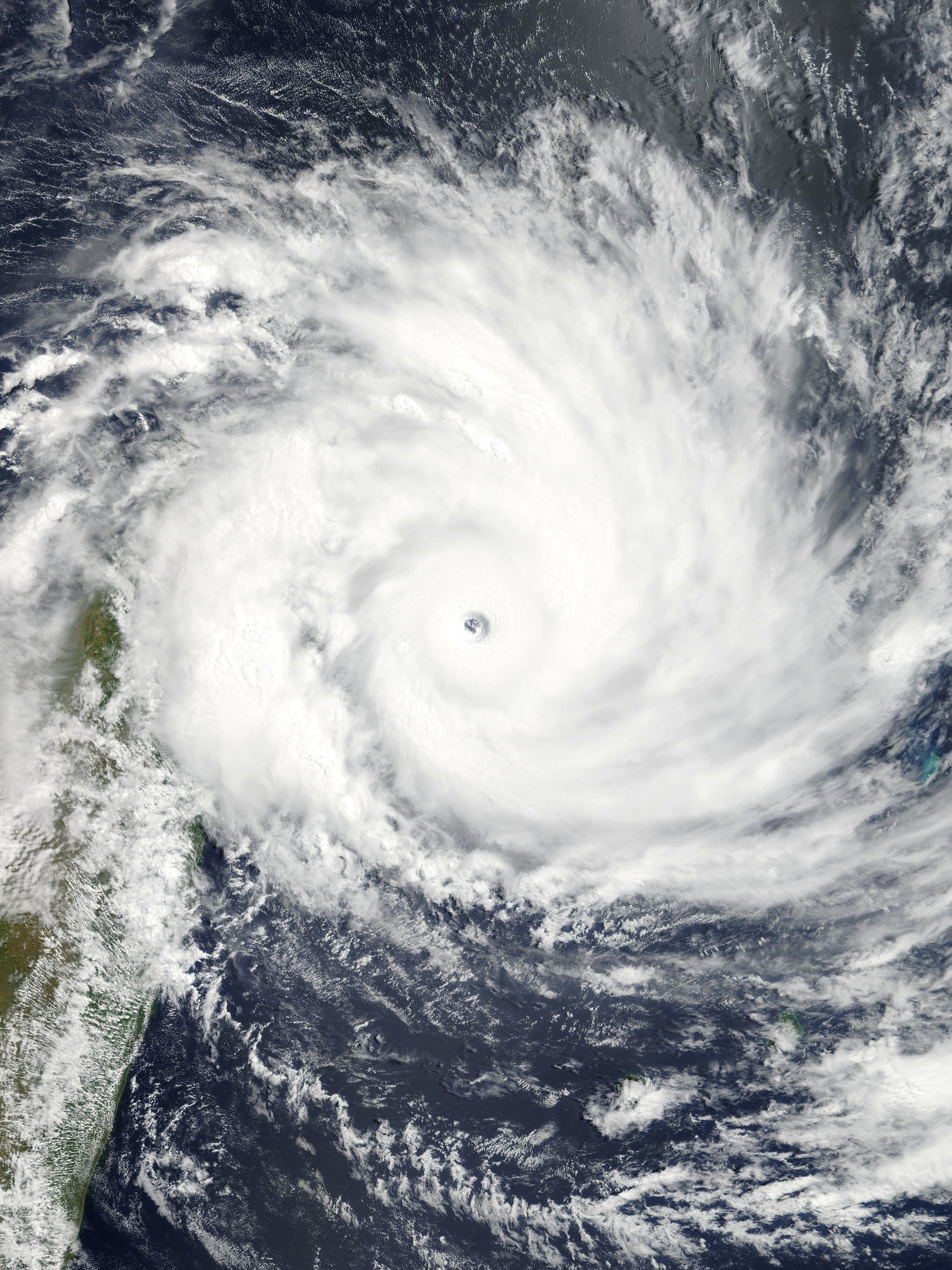
- Cyclone Gafilo near its record peak intensity while approaching Madagascar on 6 March

Meteorological history
- Formed: 1 March 2004
- Extratropical: 15 March 2004
- Dissipated: 18 March 2004

Very intense tropical cyclone
- 10-minute sustained (MFR)
- Highest winds: 230 km/h (145 mph)
- Lowest pressure: 895 hPa (mbar); 26.43 inHg (Record low in South-West Indian Ocean, Third-lowest in Southern Hemisphere)

Category 5-equivalent tropical cyclone
- 1-minute sustained (SSHWS/JTWC)
- Highest winds: 260 km/h (160 mph)
- Lowest pressure: 898 hPa (mbar); 26.52 inHg

Overall effects
- Fatalities: 363
- Missing: +181
- Damage: $250 million (2004 USD)
- Areas affected: Madagascar
- IBTrACS
- Part of the 2003–04 South-West Indian Ocean cyclone season

Very Intense Tropical Cyclone Gafilo was both the most intense tropical cyclone ever recorded in the South-West Indian Ocean and the most intense tropical cyclone worldwide in 2004. Being unusually large and intense, Gafilo was the deadliest and most destructive cyclone of the 2003–04 South-West Indian Ocean cyclone season. According to the EM-DAT International Disaster Database, Gafilo killed at least 363 people. Gafilo also caused about $250 million (2004 USD) damages in Madagascar, which makes it one of the most devastating storms to hit the country on reliable record.

Forming south of Diego Garcia, it intensified into a moderate tropical storm on 3 March. One day later, Gafilo became a tropical cyclone, and it ultimately intensified into a very intense tropical cyclone on 6 March, prior to making landfall over Madagascar early on the next day. After crossing the island, Gafilo emerged into the Mozambique Channel and made landfall over Madagascar again on 9 March. After a three-day loop overland, the system arrived at the Indian Ocean on 13 March, and it transitioned into a subtropical depression on 14 March. Gafilo then became extratropical on the next day and weakened, before dissipating on 18 March.

== Meteorological history ==
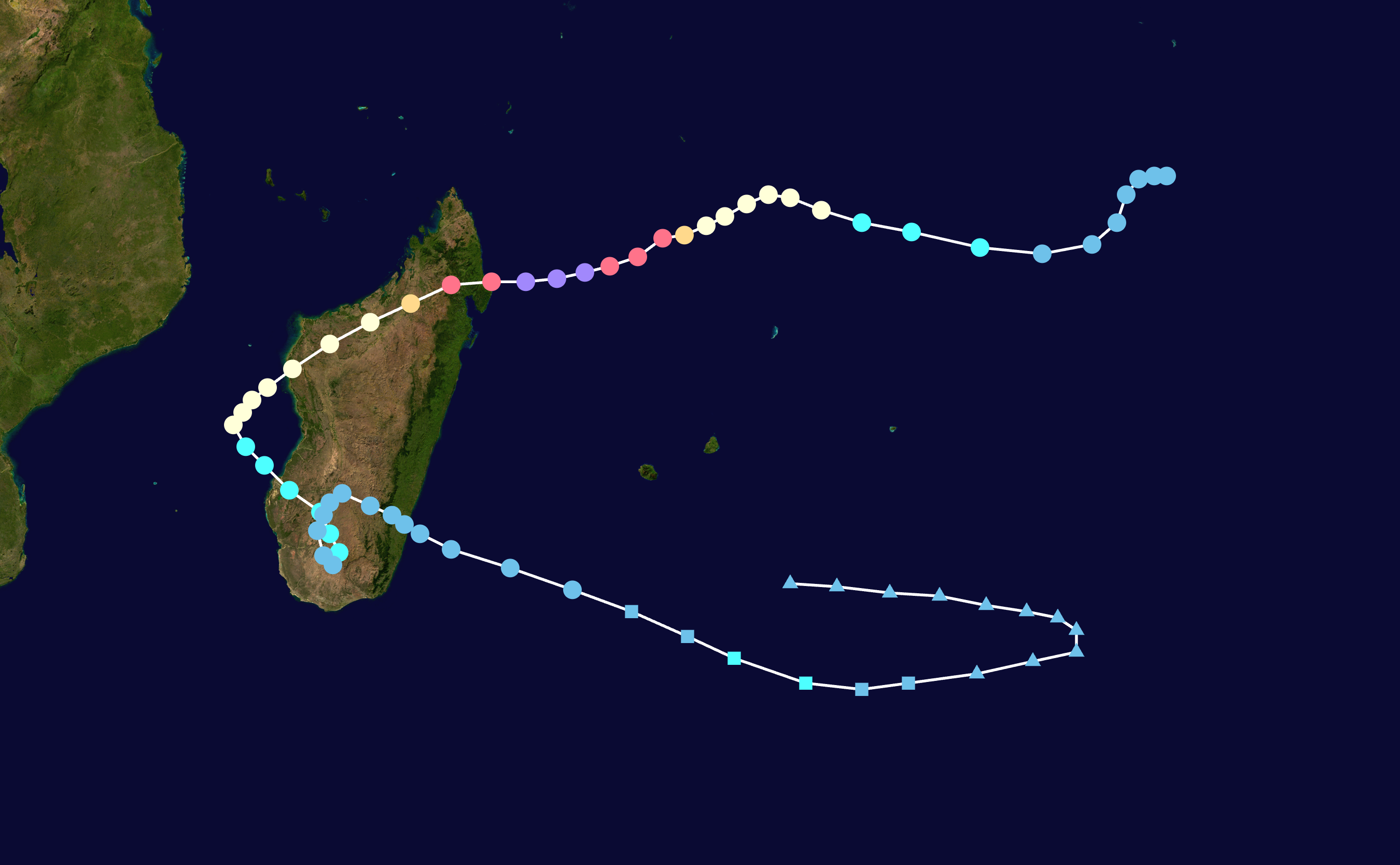
Map plotting the storm's track and intensity, according to the Saffir–Simpson scale Map key Saffir–Simpson scale Tropical depression (≤38 mph, ≤62 km/h) Tropical storm (39–73 mph, 63–118 km/h) Category 1 (74–95 mph, 119–153 km/h) Category 2 (96–110 mph, 154–177 km/h) Category 3 (111–129 mph, 178–208 km/h) Category 4 (130–156 mph, 209–251 km/h) Category 5 (≥157 mph, ≥252 km/h) Unknown Storm type Tropical cyclone Subtropical cyclone Extratropical cyclone, remnant low, tropical disturbance, or monsoon depression

A disturbance formed south of Diego Garcia on 29 February, and Météo-France La Réunion (MFR) upgraded the identified system within the monsoon trough to a tropical disturbance on the next day. On 2 March, although the centre was exposed due to moderate easterly vertical wind shear, the Joint Typhoon Warning Center (JTWC) issued a Tropical Cyclone Formation Alert on the system which was situated north of a subtropical ridge, based on improved organisation of deep convection and moderate poleward outflow. However, its temporary acceleration on that day lessened vertical wind shear. As the centre became under organised deep convection on 3 March, the system intensified into a tropical depression, then a moderate tropical storm named Gafilo by the Sub-regional Tropical Cyclone Advisory Centre in Mauritius, shortly before MFR even upgraded Gafilo to a severe tropical storm later. When the system slowed and tracked west-northwestwards along the northern periphery of a building subtropical ridge, it reached category 1 strength on the Saffir–Simpson hurricane wind scale late on 3 March. The complete pattern of the cyclone from 4 to 8 March as it moved through the south western Indian Ocean has been recorded by the TRMM through its satellite imagery. TRMM (Tropical Rainfall Measuring Mission) is a joint mission between NASA and the Japanese space agency JAXA.

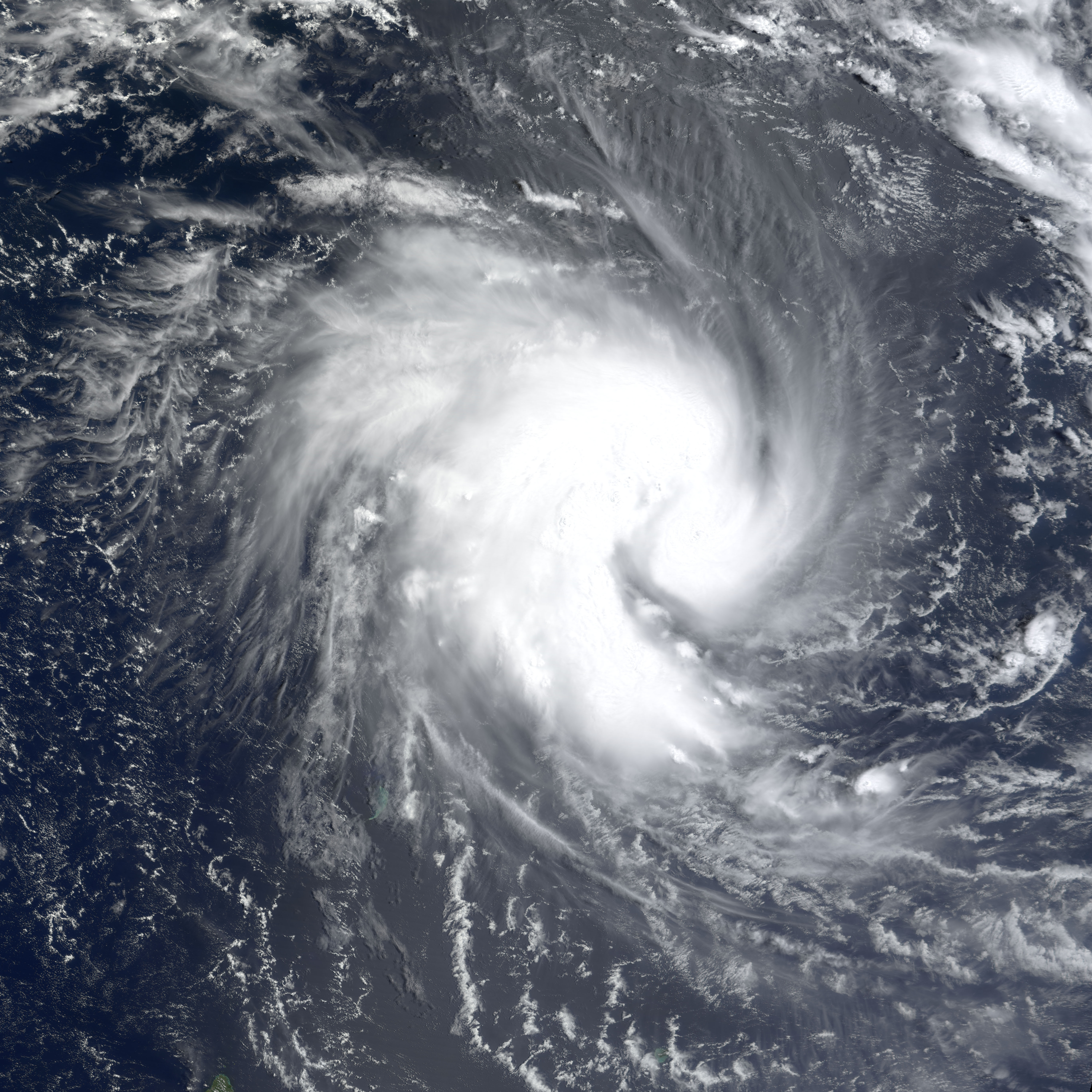
Tropical Cyclone Gafilo on 3 March

Although dry air significantly reduced deep convection on 4 March, MFR upgraded Gafilo to a tropical cyclone due to a banding eye, when the system began to expand its clockwise circulation and track west-southwestwards. By dual outflow channels, Gafilo underwent rapid deepening and reached category 4 strength on the Saffir–Simpson hurricane wind scale on 5 March, as MFR also upgraded Gafilo to an intense tropical cyclone late on the same day. On 6 March, besides warm sea surface temperature above 29 °C, the atypical third outflow channel from the west made conditions for the cyclone more favourable. Therefore, MFR upgraded Gafilo to a very intense tropical cyclone with a very well-defined circular and warm 20 nautical miles (37 km; 23 mi) diameter eye at 06Z, when it also reached category 5 strength on the Saffir–Simpson hurricane wind scale. At 12Z, Gafilo attained its peak intensity by the ten-minute maximum sustained winds reaching 125 knots (232 km/h; 144 mph) and the atmospheric pressure decreasing to 895 hPa (26.4 inHg), although microwave imagery showed that the eyewall replacement cycle had begun.

Shortly after slightly weakening due to land interaction, Gafilo made landfall in the vicinity of Antalaha, Madagascar early on 7 March. Unlike other storms, the overland depression just weakened gradually, because of its unusually large circulation making the outer part still at sea. On that day, Gafilo tracked more southwestwards along the northwestern periphery of a subtropical ridge located to the southeast. Before noon on 8 March, Gafilo arrived at the Mozambique Channel as a moderate tropical storm whose strongest winds were located in the northern sector. On 9 March, Gafilo became almost stationary and then tracked southeastwards along the western periphery of a subtropical ridge located to the east. MFR upgraded the system to a severe tropical storm supported by observed data from Malagasy stations at noon; however, JTWC analysed that the storm became below category 1 strength on the Saffir–Simpson hurricane wind scale at the same time in their best track data.

Late on 9 March, Gafilo made landfall north of Morombe, Madagascar, and the system started to make a three-day clockwise loop over the south part of Madagascar. For the system further weakened after landfall, JTWC analysed that Gafilo dissipated overland late on 11 March, as well as MFR issued a final warning on the overland depression which began to track southeastwards early on 12 March. Surprisingly, MFR began to issue warnings again on the completely disorganised system at noon on 12 March, as the residual centre was expected to go back overseas. Late on the same day, JTWC issued a Tropical Cyclone Formation Alert on the overland remnants, because of improved deep convection over the low-level circulation centre, poleward outflow and weak vertical wind shear.

Early on 13 March, Gafilo arrived at the Indian Ocean as a tropical disturbance; JTWC cancelled a Tropical Cyclone Formation Alert on the system because of the less organised low-level circulation centre and moderate vertical wind shear. Gafilo transferred into a subtropical depression south of La Réunion on 14 March, when the deep convective activity was intensifying with better organisation of a small cluster above the low-level circulation centre due to good upper-level divergence and a warm sea surface temperature of 26 °C to 29 °C. After attaining minor peak intensity in its subtropical period late on 14 March, Gafilo began to track eastward and transitioned into an extratropical depression on 15 March. Owing to a building subtropical ridge located to the southwest, the extratropical depression slowed and turned northwestwards on 16 March. After slowly weakening, the system completely dissipated on 18 March.

== Impact ==
=== Madagascar ===
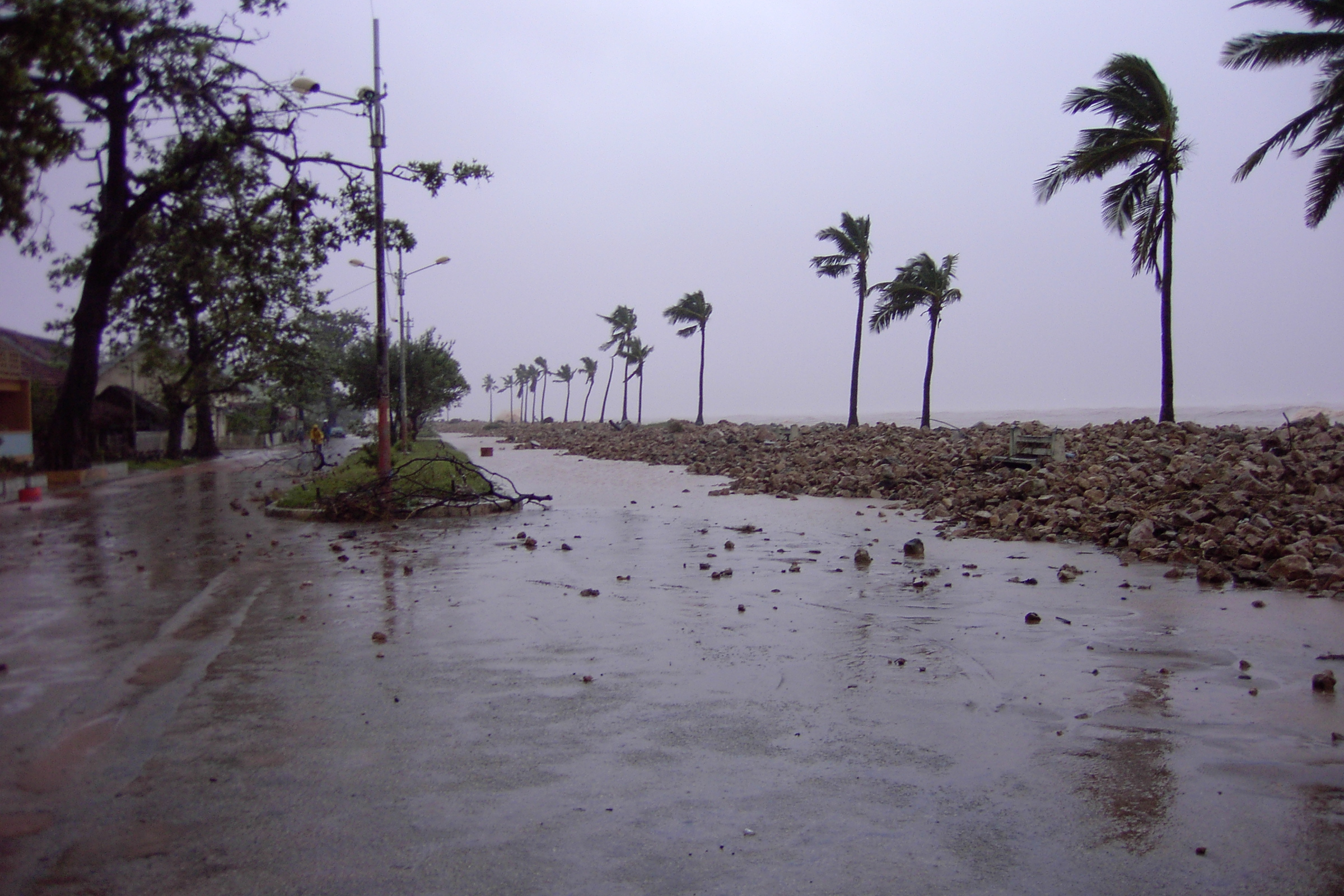
Destroyed coastline of Mahajanga, Madagascar

Gafilo caused strong winds and torrential rainfall over Madagascar. A half-day after the first landfall, hurricane-force winds were still observed near Mahajanga late on 7 March. When Gafilo was reorganising in the Mozambique Channel, 190 mm (7.5 in) of precipitation was recorded at Maintirano on 9 March, as well as 242 mm (9.5 in) was recorded at Tôlanaro on the same day. During its three-day loop overland, Gafilo brought 238 mm (9.4 in) at Morondava on 11 March.

As Elita had already struck Madagascar one month ago, damage from Gafilo created extreme devastation in the country. The National Rescue Council in Antananarivo reported 237 dead, 181 missing, 879 injured, and 304,000 homeless (174,000 in Antalaha alone). More than 20,000 homes were destroyed, as well as 413 public buildings and 3,400 schools were damaged, including 1,400 schools completely destroyed. The United Nations estimated that there were 700,000 disaster-stricken people, 280,000 of which needed urgent assistance.

Despite being located 300 km (190 mi) north of Gafilo's centre, the wreck of the ferry 'Samson' still happened on the night of 7 March, offshore the northwestern port of Mahajanga. A narrow but strong band of Gafilo caused very rough conditions at sea, causing the ferry to experience engine failure and capsize immediately after. While the number of fatalities remains undetermined, 120 people were officially on board, and only three people reached shore, surviving the shipwreck. The ferry had been heading to Madagascar from the Comoros Islands at the time of its sinking.

In Antalaha, food prices shot up by 35%, and the harbour was badly damaged and non-operational. Roads and bridges connecting the city to outlying villages were inaccessible, and electricity, water and telephone lines were cut. Overall in Madagascar, the main damage caused by Gafilo was the subsequent flooding of vast areas in the north, northwest and southwest; Where extensive, the flooding caused serious damage to vanilla, rice and banana crops. In many places, the crops were expected to be totally lost.

Moreover, shrimp harvesting also suffered. Some of the affected areas coincided with those affected by Elita, and stocks and resources were already depleted in many areas. In the absence of immediate response, an increase in water-borne diseases such as malaria and diarrhoea could have occurred immediately, while outbreaks of cholera were expected to be seen within the coming 6–8 weeks.

=== Other islands ===
Damage was minimal to other islands in the South-west Indian Ocean, but precipitation was very heavy. Far from the centre of Gafilo, 393 mm (15.5 in) was recorded at La Réunion within 48 hours, and 159 mm (6.3 in) was recorded at the Seychelles on 4 March. At a point 160 km (99 mi) south of Gafilo, ten-minute maximum sustained winds were 49 knots with a peak gust of 66 knots recorded at Tromelin Island. During 7 and 8 March, precipitation at Mayotte was recorded between 100 and 275 mm (3.9 and 10.8 in).

== Aftermath ==
Following the passage of Gafilo, the Malagasy government passed Inter-ministerial Order 17939/2004 in September 2004, which cleared the way for export of new and existing stocks of rosewood as 'salvage'. This created anarchy in the national parks in the Sava Region, with loggers extracting a large quantity of rosewood and ebony, grossly disproportionate to the amount of damage caused by the storm. During this time, Marojejy National Park reported that with the granting of export rights, logging in the park had resumed. It was not until 2006, with the passing of Inter-ministerial Order 16030/2006, that the export ban was reinstated, nearly two years after the storm, but not before the exporters lobbied the government for an extension 'following the grievances expressed by operators' in October 2005, per Memorandum 923/05. Exports were also authorized following cyclones in 2006 and 2007, encouraging the stockpiling of large quantities of lumber in both legal depots and hidden caches around the ports of Vohémar and Antalaha.

== Records ==
With ten-minute maximum sustained winds of 125 knots (232 km/h; 144 mph) (later equaled by Hellen in 2014 and Eunice in 2015, and surpassed by Fantala in 2016, with 10-min sustained winds of 135 knots (250 km/h; 155 mph) and an atmospheric pressure of 895 hPa (26.4 inHg), Gafilo became the most intense tropical cyclone in the South-West Indian Ocean since reliable records began to be kept. In addition, Gafilo was the only tropical cyclone in the basin having an atmospheric pressure below 900 hPa (27 inHg) since Chris–Damia in 1982. Gafilo made landfall over Madagascar early on 7 March as a very intense tropical cyclone with ten-minute maximum sustained winds of 120 knots (220 km/h; 140 mph) and an atmospheric pressure of 905 hPa (26.7 inHg), becoming the strongest storm to make landfall over Madagascar, and even Africa, on record, tied with Hary for both of those records in 2002.

== See also ==
- Cyclone Elita (2004)
- Cyclone Ivan (2008)
- Cyclone Giovanna (2012)
- Cyclone Fantala (2016) – Storm with the highest sustained winds recorded in the South-West Indian Ocean basin
- Cyclone Enawo (2017)
- Cyclone Winston (2016) – The most intense tropical cyclone recorded in the Southern Hemisphere
- Cyclone Mahina (1899) - unofficially, the most intense tropical cyclone recorded in the Southern Hemisphere
- Cyclone Ambali (2019) – A very intense tropical cyclone that formed in December 2019
- Illegal logging in Madagascar
