= 2015–16 South-West Indian Ocean cyclone season =

Cyclone season in the Southwest Indian Ocean

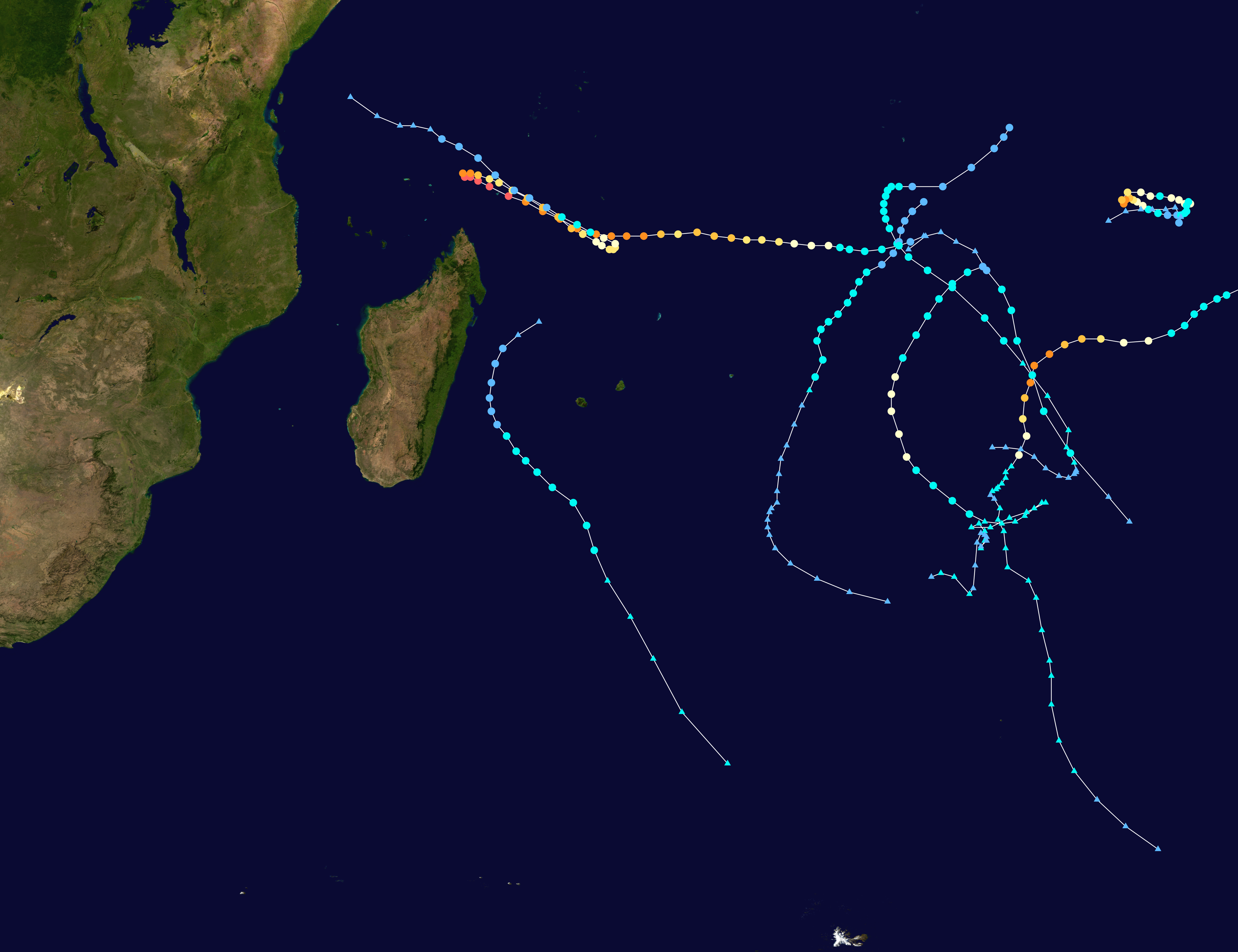
- Season summary map

Seasonal boundaries
- First system formed: 19 November 2015
- Last system dissipated: 23 April 2016

Strongest storm
- Name: Fantala
  - Maximum winds: 250 km/h (155 mph) (10-minute sustained)
  - Lowest pressure: 910 hPa (mbar)

Seasonal statistics
- Total disturbances: 8
- Total depressions: 8
- Total storms: 8
- Tropical cyclones: 3
- Intense tropical cyclones: 3
- Very intense tropical cyclones: 1
- Total fatalities: 13 total
- Total damage: $4.5 million (2016 USD)

Related articles
- 2015–16 Australian region cyclone season; 2015–16 South Pacific cyclone season

The 2015–16 South-West Indian Ocean cyclone season was a slightly below average event in tropical cyclone formation. The annual cyclone season began on November 15, 2015, with the first storm, Annabelle, forming four days following. The final and strongest storm, Fantala, dissipated on April 23, 2016, a week before the season ended on April 30 for most of the region. In Mauritius and the Seychelles, the cyclone season ended half a month later, on May 15. The season's activity was influenced by an ongoing El Niño, and a positive Indian Ocean Dipole.

The South-West Indian Ocean basin consists of the portion of the Indian Ocean west of 90°E and south of the Equator. Tropical cyclone activity was monitored by Météo-France office in Réunion, the Regional Specialized Meteorological Centre for the basin. The basin is also unofficially monitored by the Joint Typhoon Warning Center, which uses one-minute sustained winds to estimate wind speeds within systems, while Météo-France uses ten-minute sustained winds and its own intensity scale.

Eight moderate tropical storms in total developed or existed within the bounds of the basin, slightly below the average of ten. Most systems during the season remained weak, with only three storms (Uriah, Emeraude, and Fantala) reaching at least tropical cyclone strength with winds of 120 km/h (75 mph), compared to the average of five. However, the season featured Cyclone Fantala, which became the strongest tropical cyclone on record in the basin in terms of 10-minute sustained winds at 250 km/h (155 mph) and in terms of 1-minute sustained winds at 285 km/h (180 mph).

== Seasonal forecasts ==
On October 19, the Mauritius Meteorological Services (MMS) released their summer 2015–16 outlook. An average season, with around seven to nine cyclones forming, was expected. MMS also indicated that the equatorial region to the north of Mauritius, east of Agaléga and west of Diego Garcia, could be significantly conducive for cyclone formation.

Météo-France issued their seasonal forecast of cyclone activity for the basin on November 12. MFR predicted a slightly below average to average season, citing the effects of a very strong El Niño event. Compared to an average of ten moderate tropical storms that usually form in the South-West Indian Ocean, a 70% chance was given to the probability of six to ten named storms forming. A 20% chance was given to the formation of only five cyclones or less, and a 10% was given to an above average level of activity. MRF expected that an above average number of named storms would develop in the central region of the basin (from 60°E to 77°E), and that there would be lower than average activity to the east of 77°E. Activity near normal was expected west of 60°E. MFR also predicted that the motion of cyclones during the season would have a stronger meridional component than normal, having a tendency to track south quickly.

== Seasonal summary ==
The season started on November 19, with the formation of Annabelle. After a month of inactivity, Bohale formed, but was fairly weak and only reached moderate tropical cyclone strength. Another month passed before Corentin formed on January 20. In February, the basin became somewhat active with Daya forming, and Uriah entering the basin days later. Emeraude formed in March, quickly peaking at intense tropical cyclone strength, before quickly weakening. Moderate Tropical Storm 07 formed at the end of March. In April, the season began to wind down. Very Intense Tropical Cyclone Fantala formed near the end of the month, and reached peak intensity as the strongest tropical cyclone recorded in the basin in terms of sustained winds. Fantala dissipated on April 23, ending the season.

== Systems ==
=== Severe Tropical Storm Annabelle ===
- Severe tropical storm (MFR)
- Tropical storm (SSHWS)
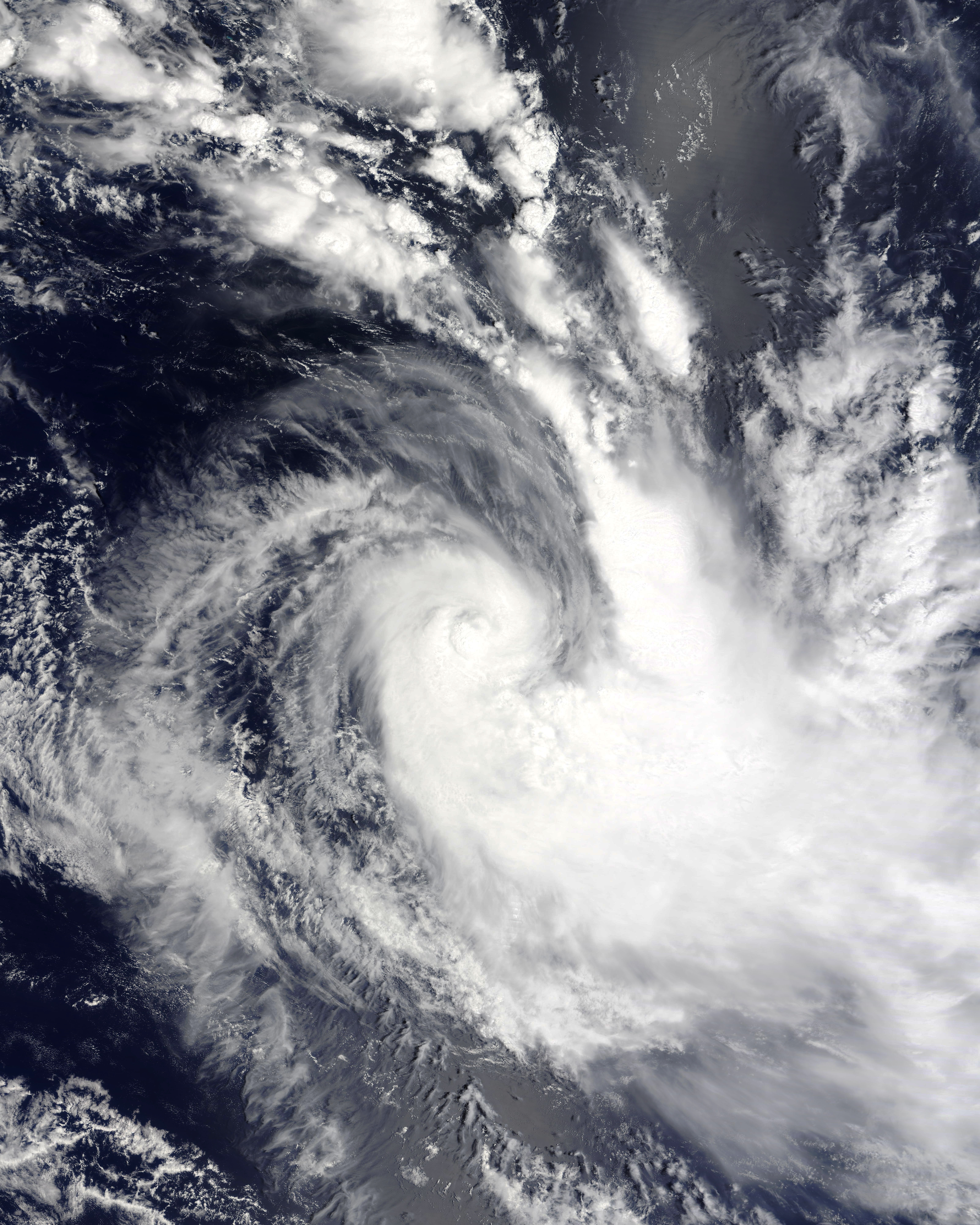
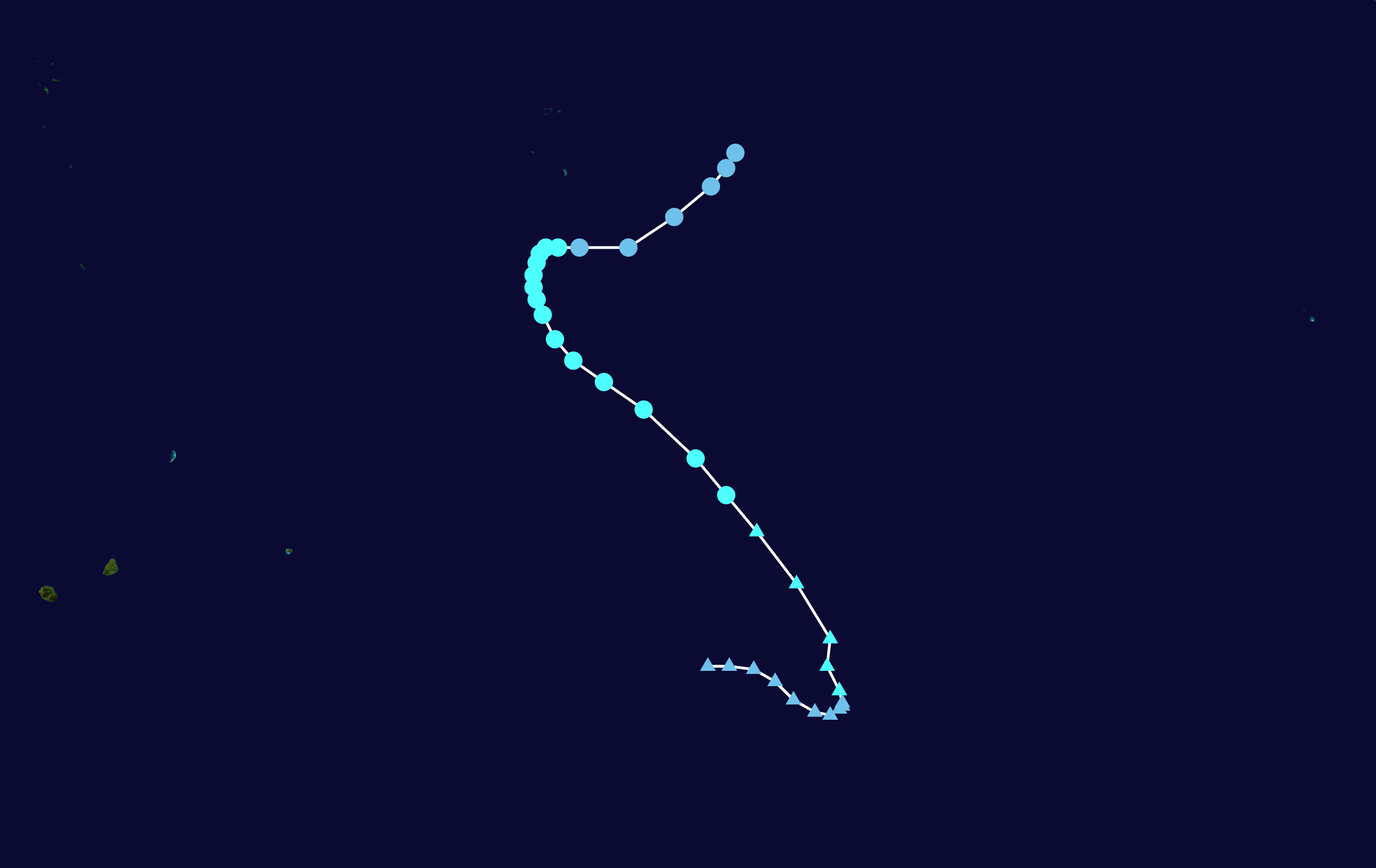
- Duration: November 19 – November 23
- Peak intensity: 100 km/h (65 mph) (10-min); 983 hPa (mbar)

Météo-France first noted a zone of disturbed weather about 930 km (580 mi) east-northeast of Diego Garcia on November 18. It was designated as a tropical disturbance the next day, and upgraded to a tropical depression shortly thereafter. On November 20, the system's organization continued to improve with tight convective banding and it was upgraded to moderate tropical storm status about 270 km (170 mi) south of Diego Garcia. The system was not named Annabelle operationally until early the next day. Annabelle intensified slowly for several days as it drifted south-southeast. The system accelerated to the southeast and developed an eye feature. Annabelle became a severe tropical storm early on November 23, benefiting from strong upper level divergence aloft. Six hours later, Annabelle reached its peak intensity of 100 km/h (65 mph). By November 24, Annabelle's convection became disorganized as a result of increased wind shear induced by an upper level trough and cooler ocean temperatures and it was declared post-tropical. The remnants of Annabelle weakened in the following days until it dissipated during November 27.

=== Moderate Tropical Storm Bohale ===
- Moderate tropical storm (MFR)
- Tropical storm (SSHWS)
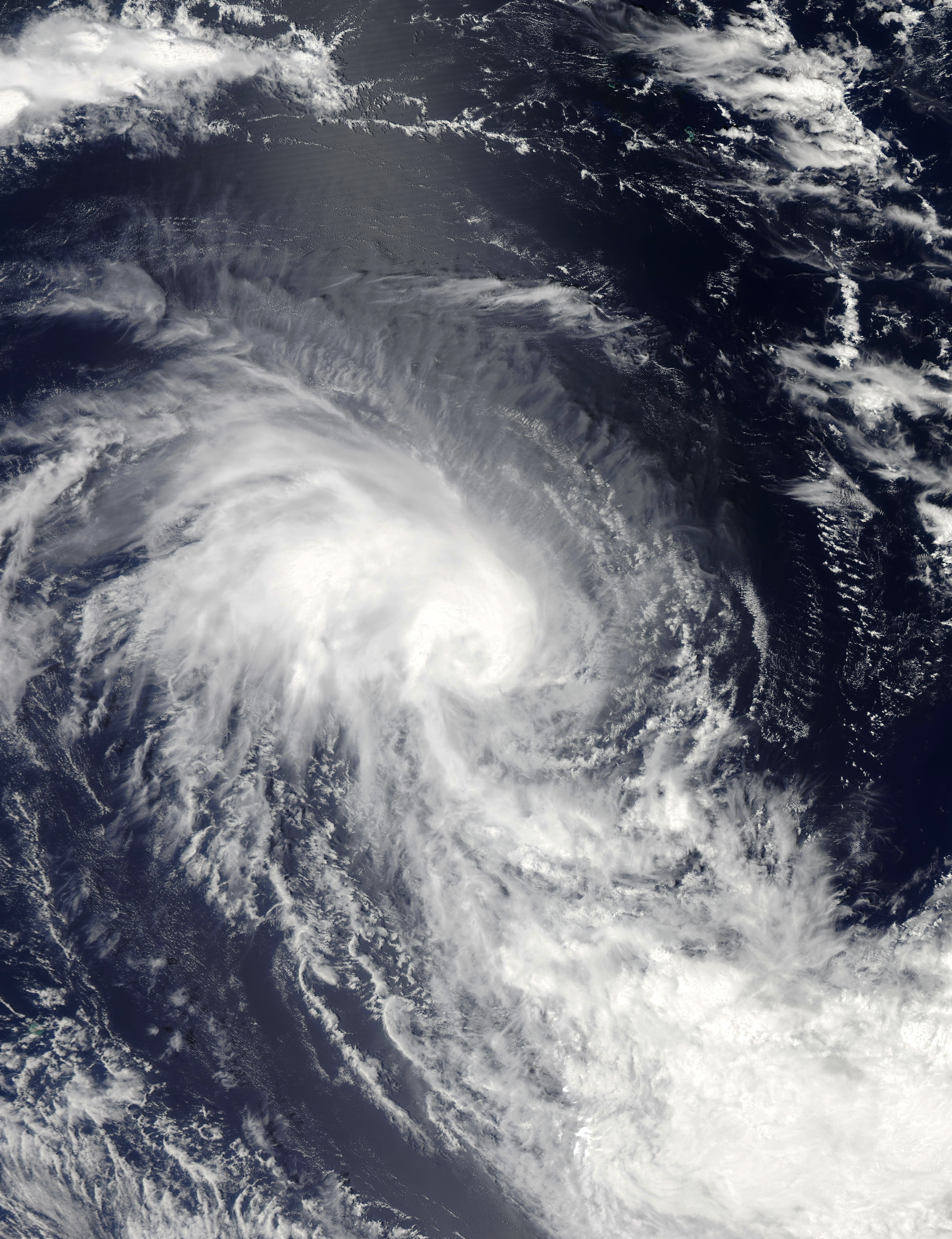
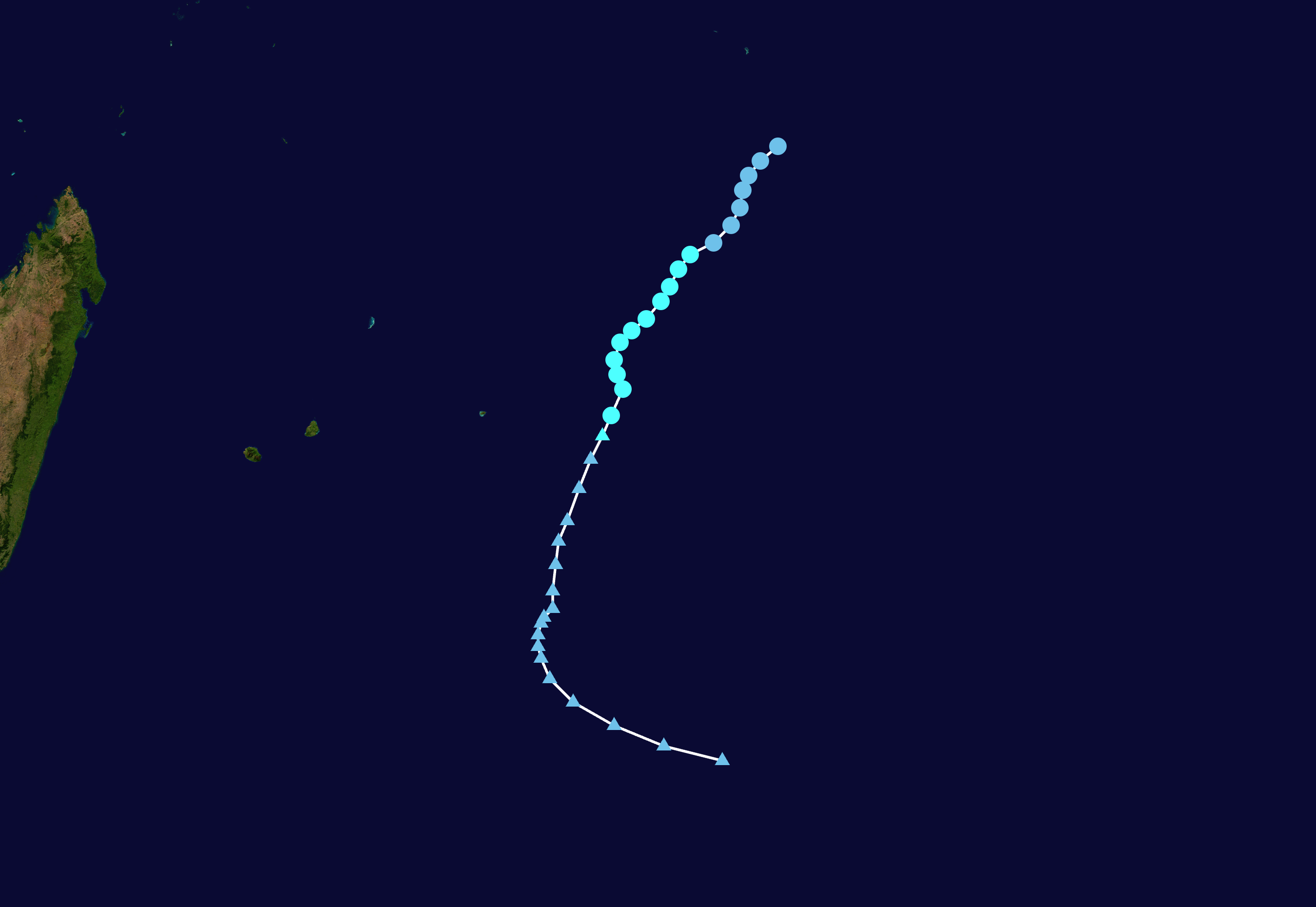
- Duration: December 9 – December 12
- Peak intensity: 65 km/h (40 mph) (10-min); 995 hPa (mbar)

On December 3, a disorganized area of convection developed over the equatorial regions of the central Indian Ocean. The system tracked generally southwest until it intensified into Tropical Depression 02 on December 10. The tropical depression gradually turned to the south-southwest and exhibited weak convection, leaving the system exposed as it struggled to intensify within a dry air mass. It received the name Bohale from the Mauritius Meteorological Services early on December 11 when it was operationally determined to have become a moderate tropical storm. In post-season re-analysis, Météo-France determined that Bohale became a tropical storm a day later, on December 12. Bohale maintained its peak intensity of 65 km/h (40 mph) as a moderate tropical storm for 18 hours, before transitioning into a post-tropical depression at 18 UTC while retaining its gale-force winds. The post-tropical remnants of Bohale tracked south slowly until they dissipated on December 16.

=== Severe Tropical Storm Corentin ===
- Severe tropical storm (MFR)
- Category 1 tropical cyclone (SSHWS)
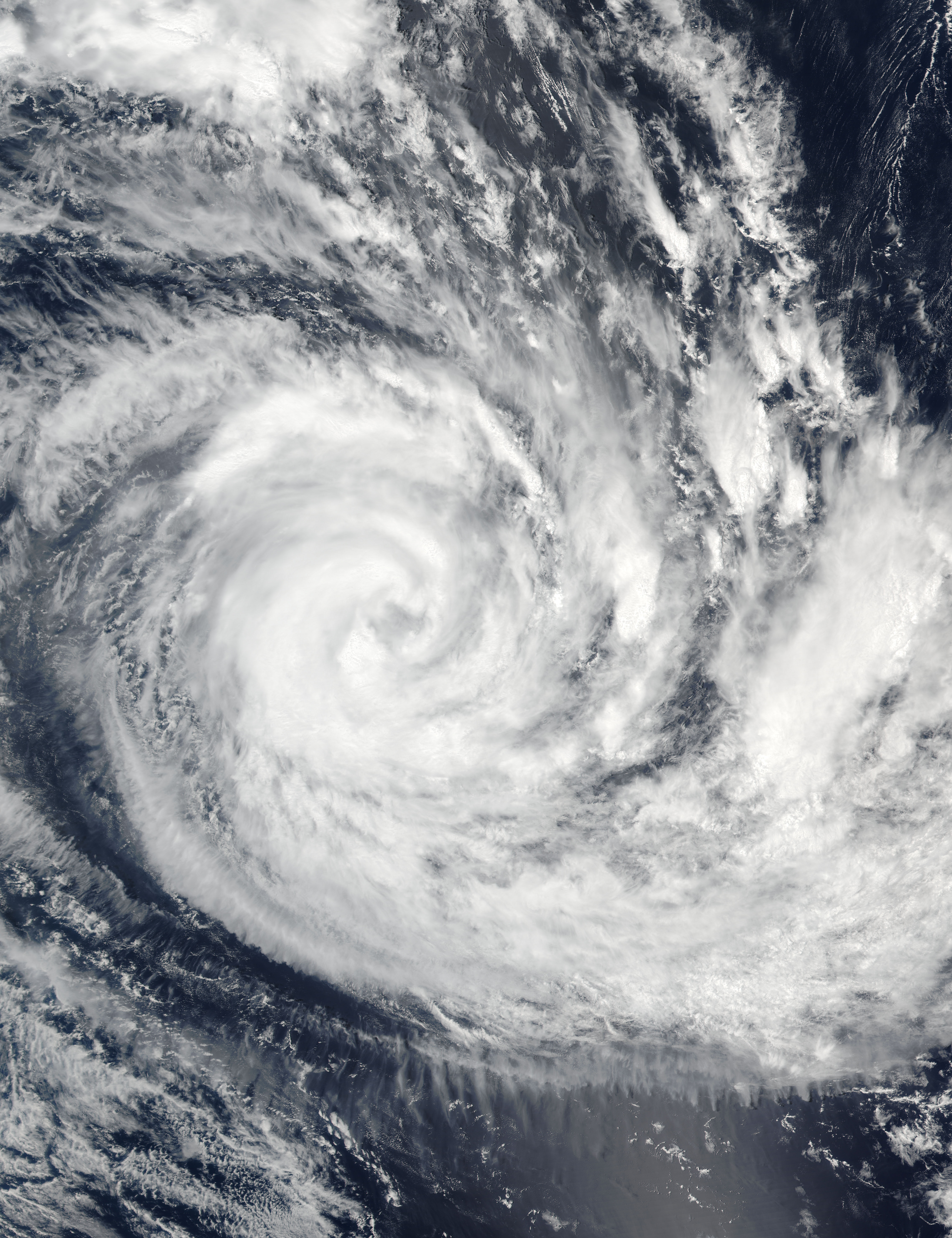
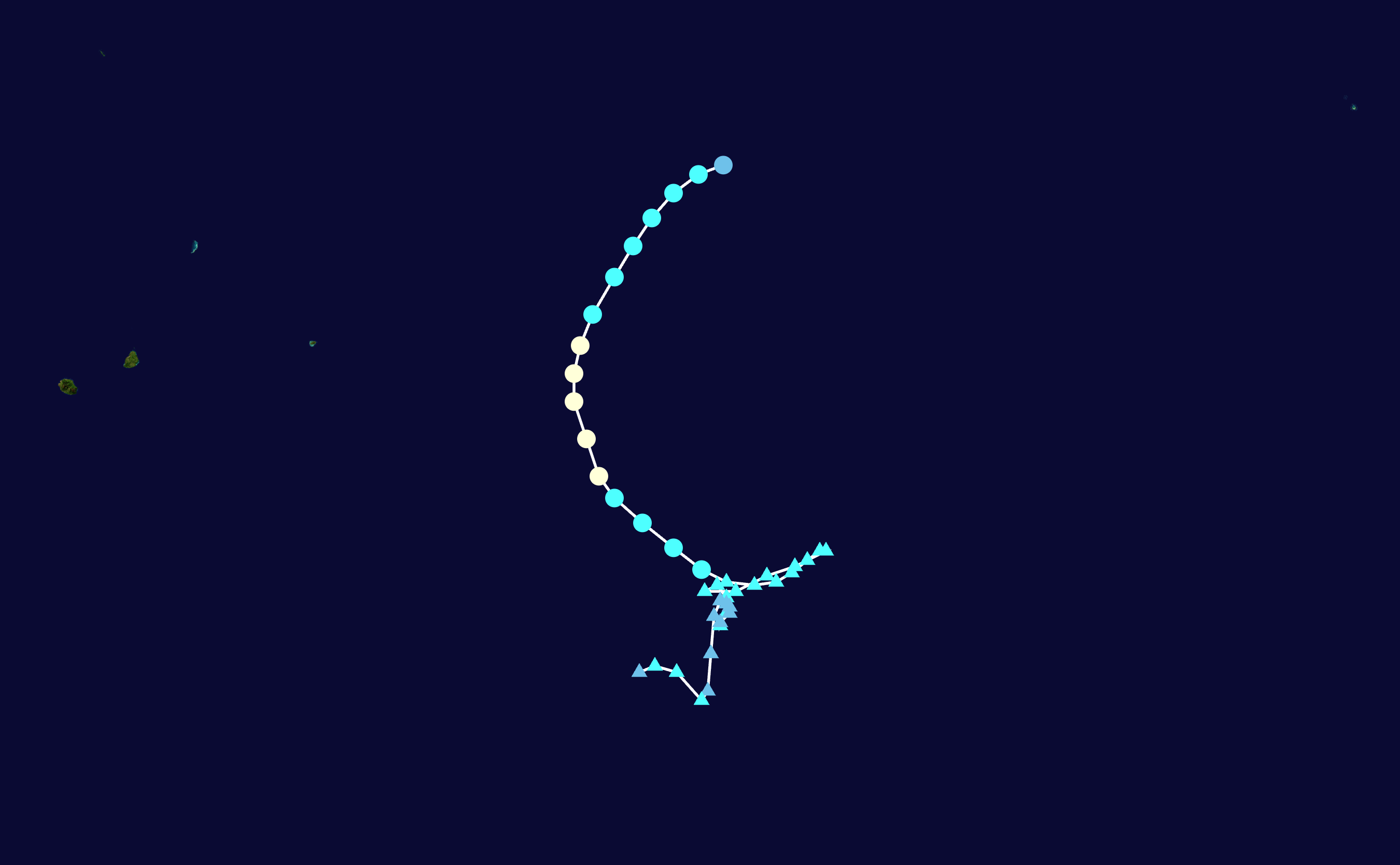
- Duration: January 20 – January 24
- Peak intensity: 110 km/h (70 mph) (10-min); 975 hPa (mbar)

Météo-France identified a tropical disturbance moving generally westward over the eastern Indian Ocean on January 20. At midday the next day, the disturbance intensified into a moderate tropical storm which received the name Corentin. Corentin continued to steadily intensify under an upper-level ridge as its motion began to turn towards the south. The system was upgraded to severe tropical storm status on January 22 as it tracked nearly due south. Corentin peaked later that day with 10-minute maximum sustained wind speeds of 110 km/h (70 mph) and a large, 110 km (70 mi) ragged eye. The system began to weaken on January 23 as its satellite representation deteriorated and its eye began to widen. The storm continued to weaken as the upper-level wind pattern became unfavorable. With its center exposed and moving over cooler waters, Corentin transitioned into a post-tropical depression on January 24. The post-tropical remnants of Corentin meandered in the southern Indian Ocean until its remnant low dissipated on January 31.

=== Moderate Tropical Storm Daya ===
- Moderate tropical storm (MFR)
- Tropical storm (SSHWS)
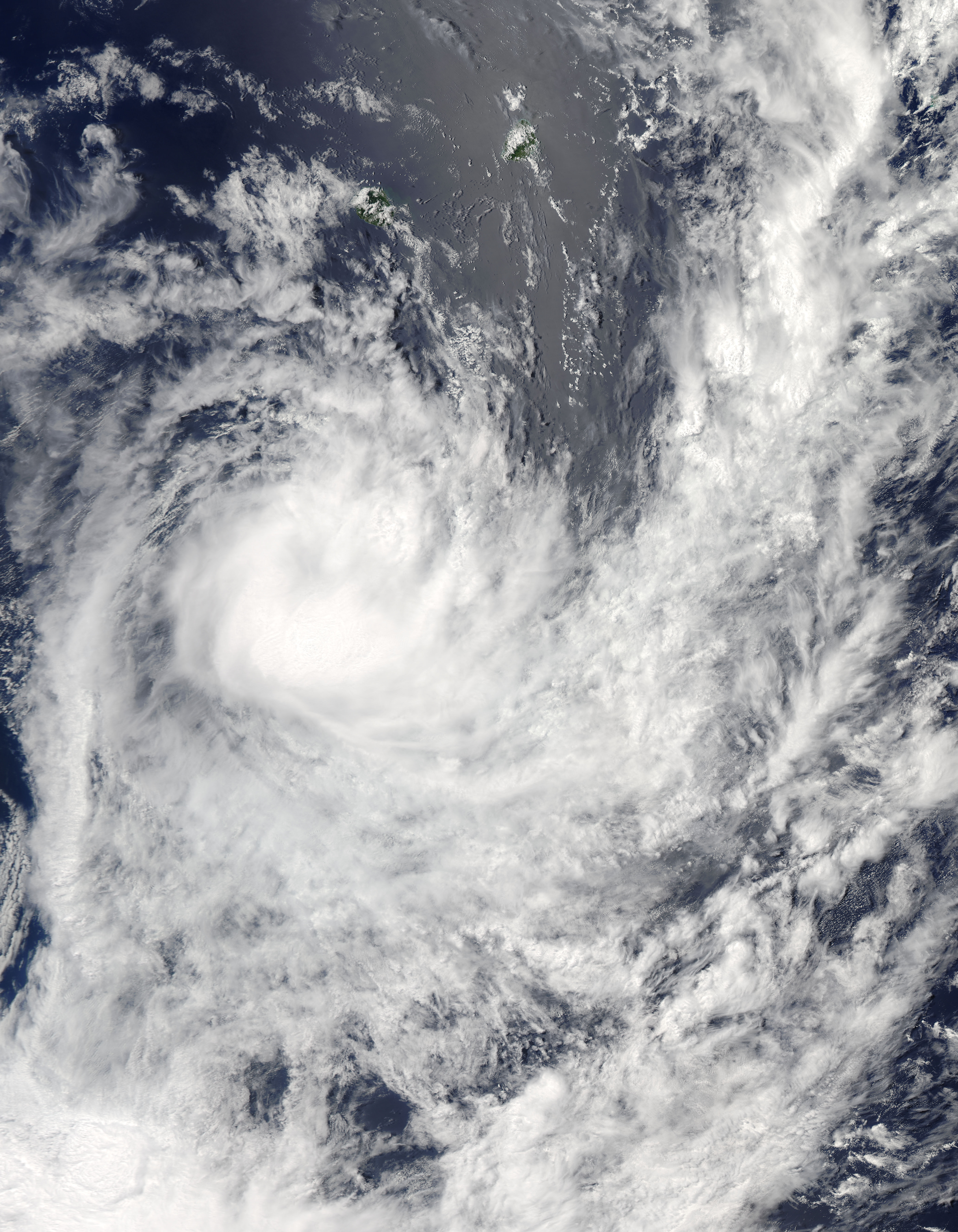
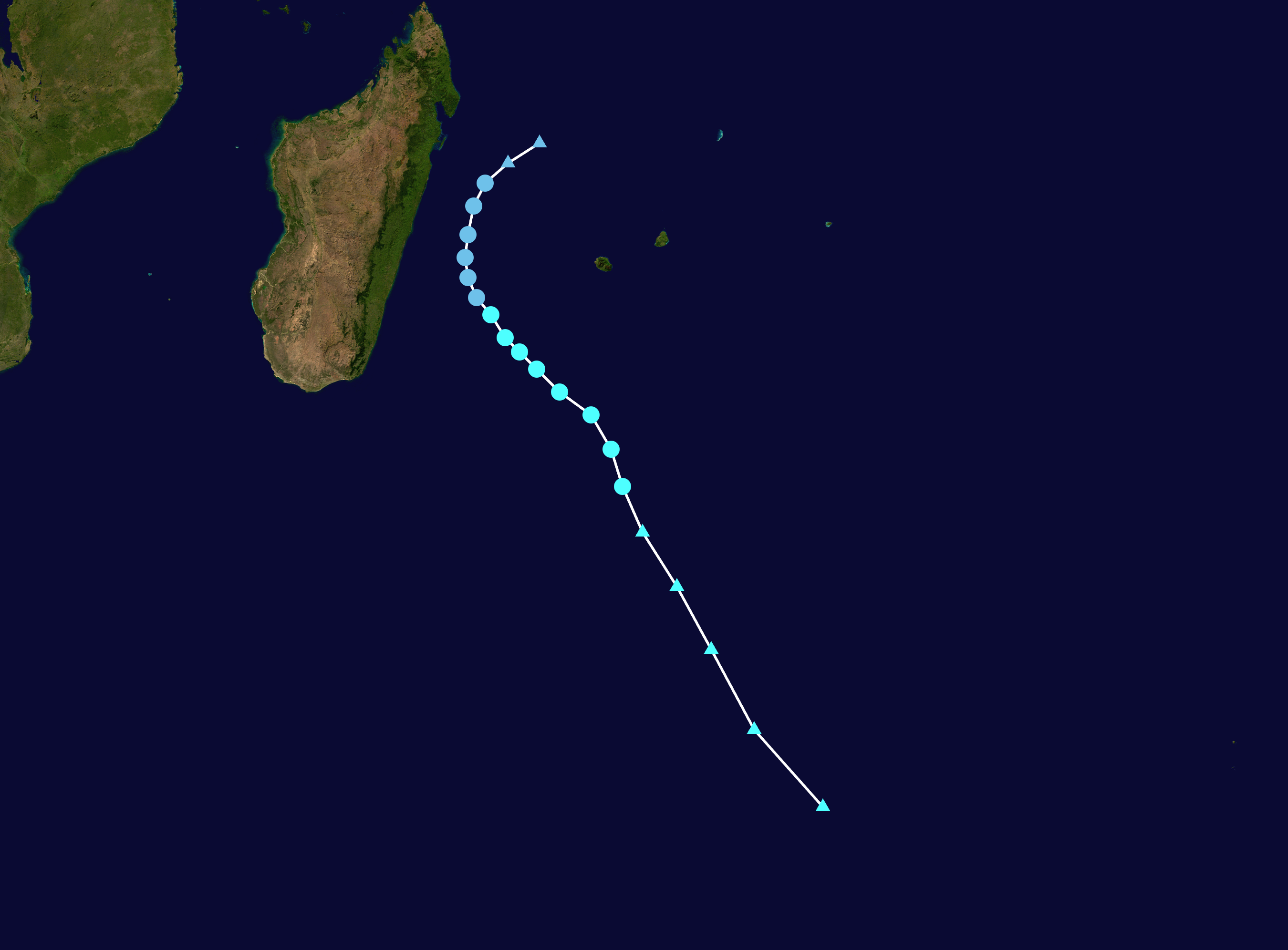
- Duration: February 8 – February 12
- Peak intensity: 65 km/h (40 mph) (10-min); 990 hPa (mbar)

A low-pressure area developed within a monsoon trough over the Mozambique Channel on February 1. It tracked southeastward, crossing Madagascar and becoming a tropical disturbance 380 km (235 mi) north of Saint-Denis, Réunion on February 8. The disturbance began to travel generally southwestward, intensifying slowly. The next day, the system turned southeast under the influence of a ridge to its east and a cut-off low to the southwest. On February 11, the system was classified as Moderate Tropical Storm Daya, while located about 545 km (340 mi) south-southwest of Saint-Denis. Daya accelerated to the southeast under the influence of the ridge and favorable poleward divergence allowed the system to peak with maximum sustained winds of 65 km/h (40 mph) early the next day. Daya quickly met strong wind shear, which led to its transition into a post-tropical depression on February 12. Météo-France ceased monitoring post-tropical Daya the following day.

Between February 9 and 10, heavy rain from Daya affected parts of Madagascar, Réunion, and Mauritius. During a 24-hour period, 111 mm (4.4 in) of rain fell in Vacoas-Phoenix, Mauritius, and 100 mm (3.9 in) fell in Saint-Denis, Réunion. Flash flooding damaged homes and displaced hundreds of people in Mauritius.

=== Intense Tropical Cyclone Uriah ===
- Intense tropical cyclone (MFR)
- Category 4 tropical cyclone (SSHWS)
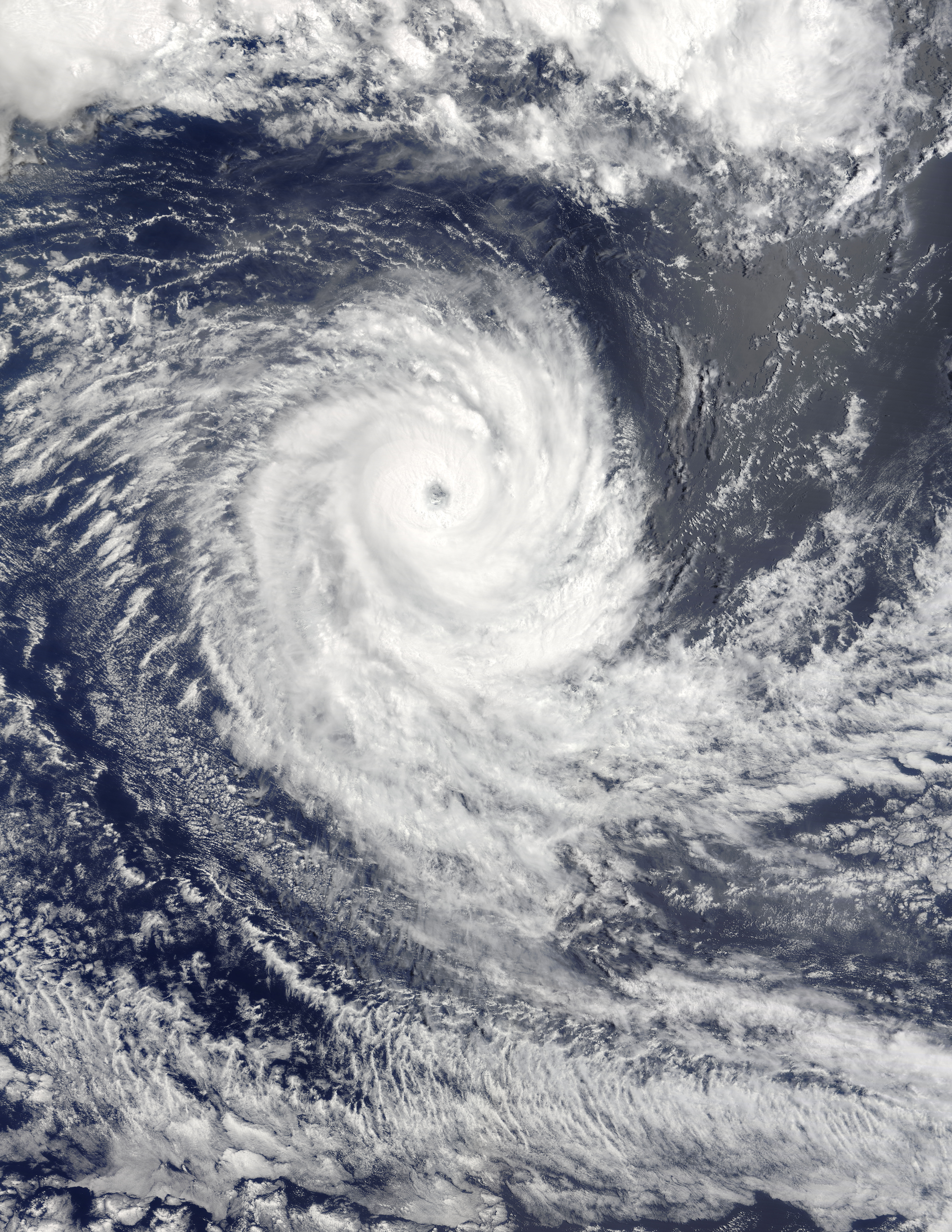
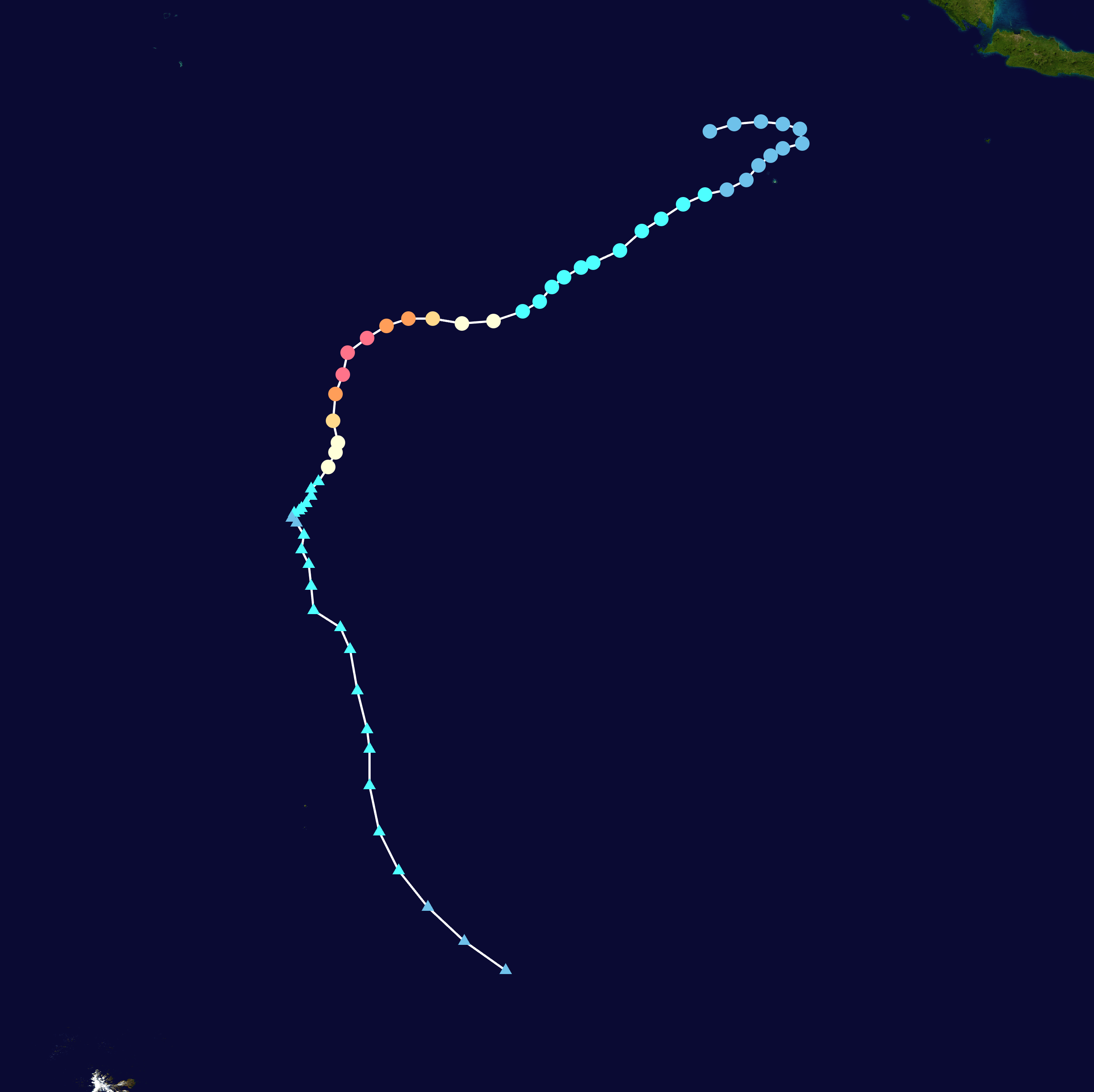
- Duration: February 14 (Entered basin) – February 19
- Peak intensity: 205 km/h (125 mph) (10-min); 925 hPa (mbar)

Uriah entered the South-West Indian Ocean basin as a moderate tropical storm from the Australian region on February 14, where it was previously monitored by the Bureau of Meteorology's office in Perth. The storm tracked generally southwest, maintaining intensity. Early on February 16, Uriah began to intensify steadily, turning to the west as a subtropical ridge built in to the south of the system. Uriah also began to develop an eye, which became evident later that day. On February 17, Uriah attained hurricane-force (74 mph or 118 km/h) winds, becoming the first tropical cyclone of the season. Continuing to rapidly intensify, Uriah became an intense tropical cyclone twelve hours later. As the ridge previously located to the south of Uriah rebuilt to its east, the intense tropical cyclone began to turn to the south. As northwesterly wind shear began to affect the system, its appearance began to deteriorate and its convection lessened. Uriah rapidly weakened to a severe tropical storm by February 19, and it transitioned to a post-tropical depression shortly thereafter. Uriah's remnants meandered, nearly stationary in the southern Indian Ocean, until it became an extratropical depression and raced to the southeast.

=== Intense Tropical Cyclone Emeraude ===
- Intense tropical cyclone (MFR)
- Category 4 tropical cyclone (SSHWS)
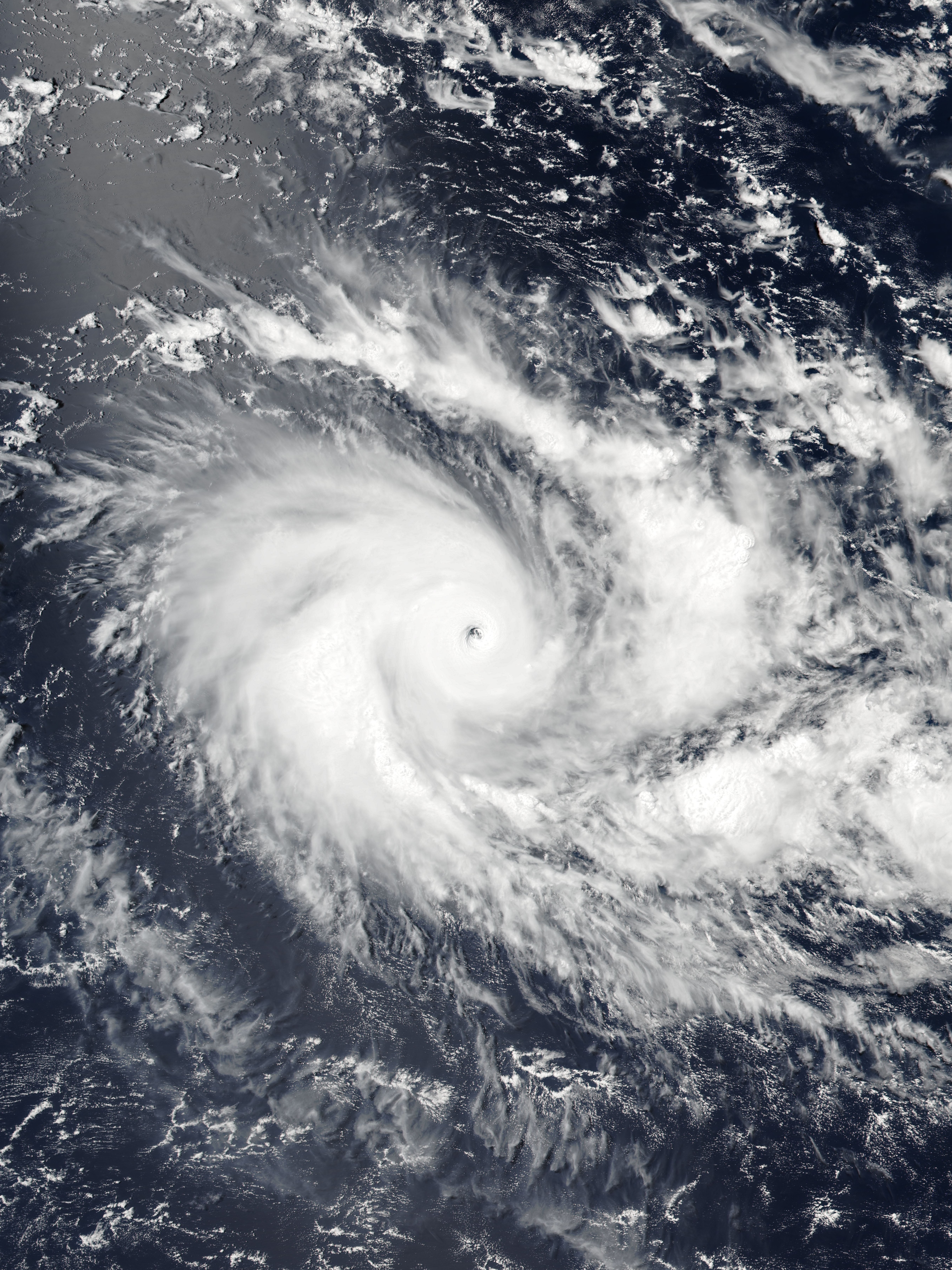
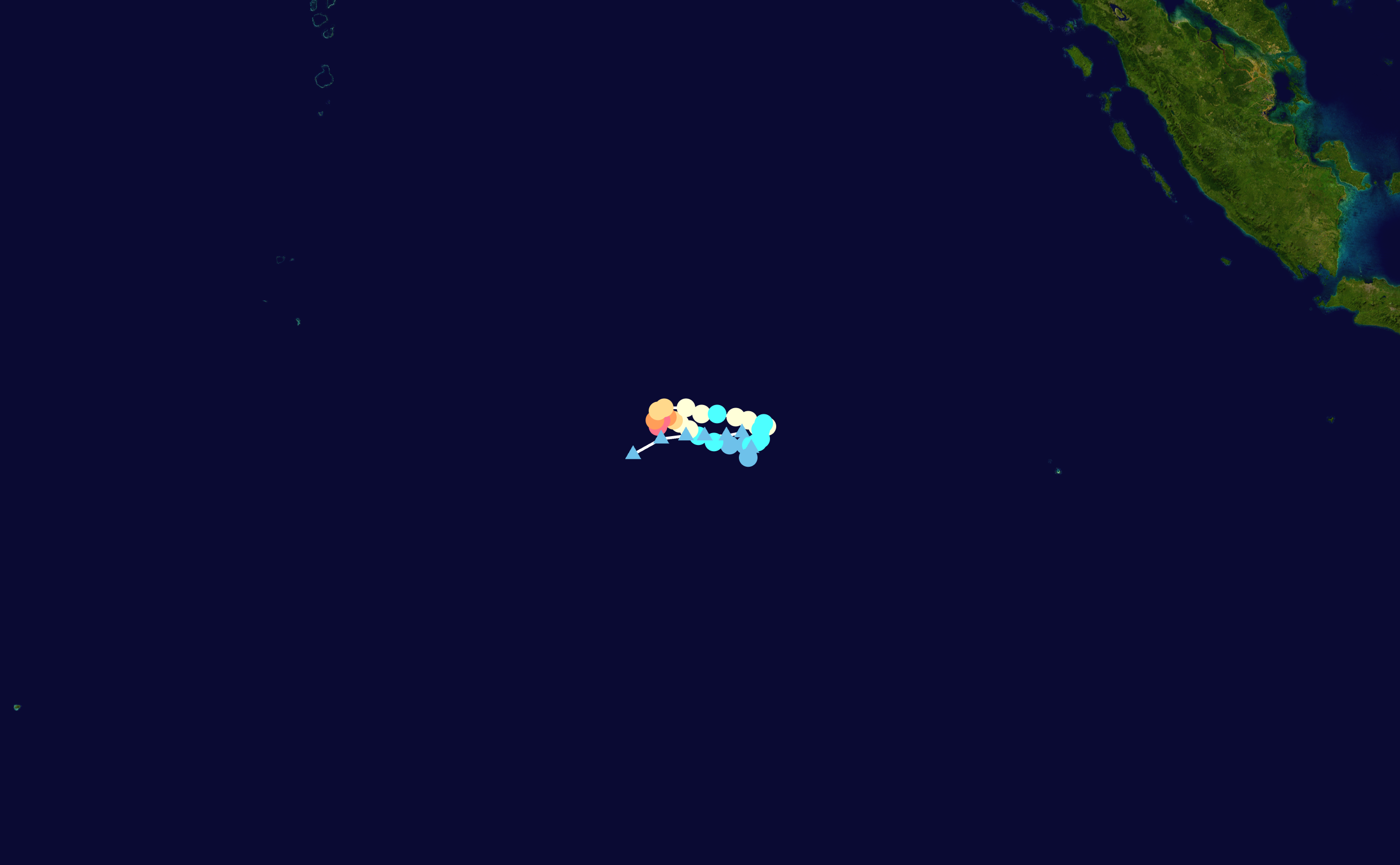
- Duration: March 15 – March 21
- Peak intensity: 205 km/h (125 mph) (10-min); 940 hPa (mbar)

Moderate Tropical Storm Emeraude developed near the eastern periphery of the basin on March 15. With favorable environmental conditions and a good poleward outflow channel, the storm rapidly intensified into a tropical cyclone the next day. The small cyclone tracked slowly toward the west-northwest, continuing to strengthen rapidly. It became an intense tropical cyclone early on March 17, reaching peak sustained wind speeds of 205 km/h (125 mph). Under the influence of a strengthening near equatorial ridge located to its northeast, Emeraude's motion began to slow and turn to the east. The cyclone was quickly affected by increasing wind shear and decreased oceanic heat content induced by its slow movement, resulting in significant weakening. Unable to reach favorable conditions, Emeraude weakened below tropical cyclone intensity by 0600 UTC on March 18, 24 hours after reaching peak intensity. The system briefly weakened into a moderate tropical storm before restrengthening early the next day once it reached warmer waters. Emeraude turned to the south and approached tropical cyclone strength on March 19, but remained a severe tropical storm. Conditions became unfavorable yet again and wind shear increased, pushing convection away from the system's center, allowing for weakening to occur once again. Emeraude ceased to produce gale-force winds and became a tropical depression on March 21. Its remnant low dissipated on March 23 just south of the waters where it had reached peak intensity five days prior.

=== Moderate Tropical Storm 07 ===
- Moderate tropical storm (MFR)
- Tropical storm (SSHWS)
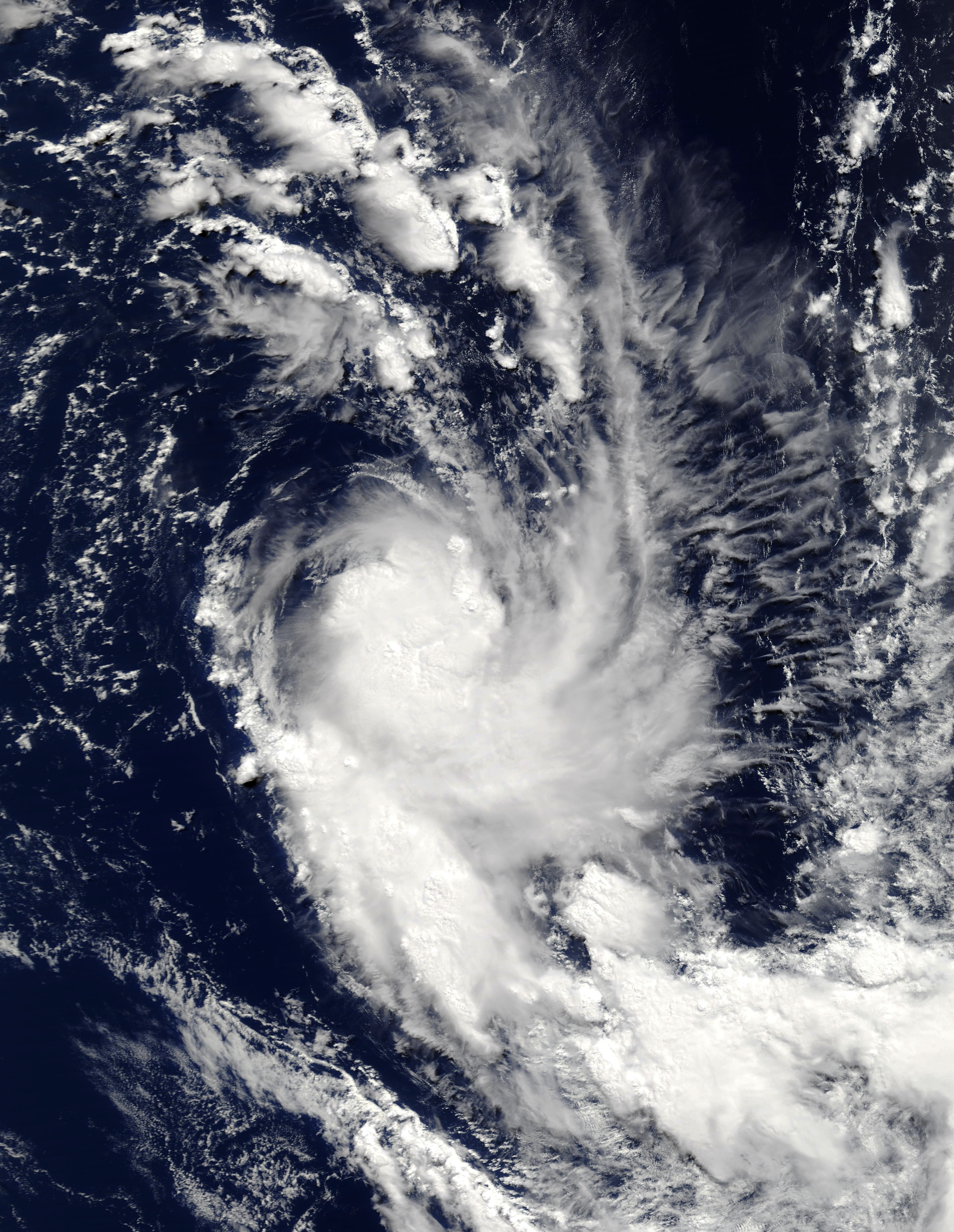
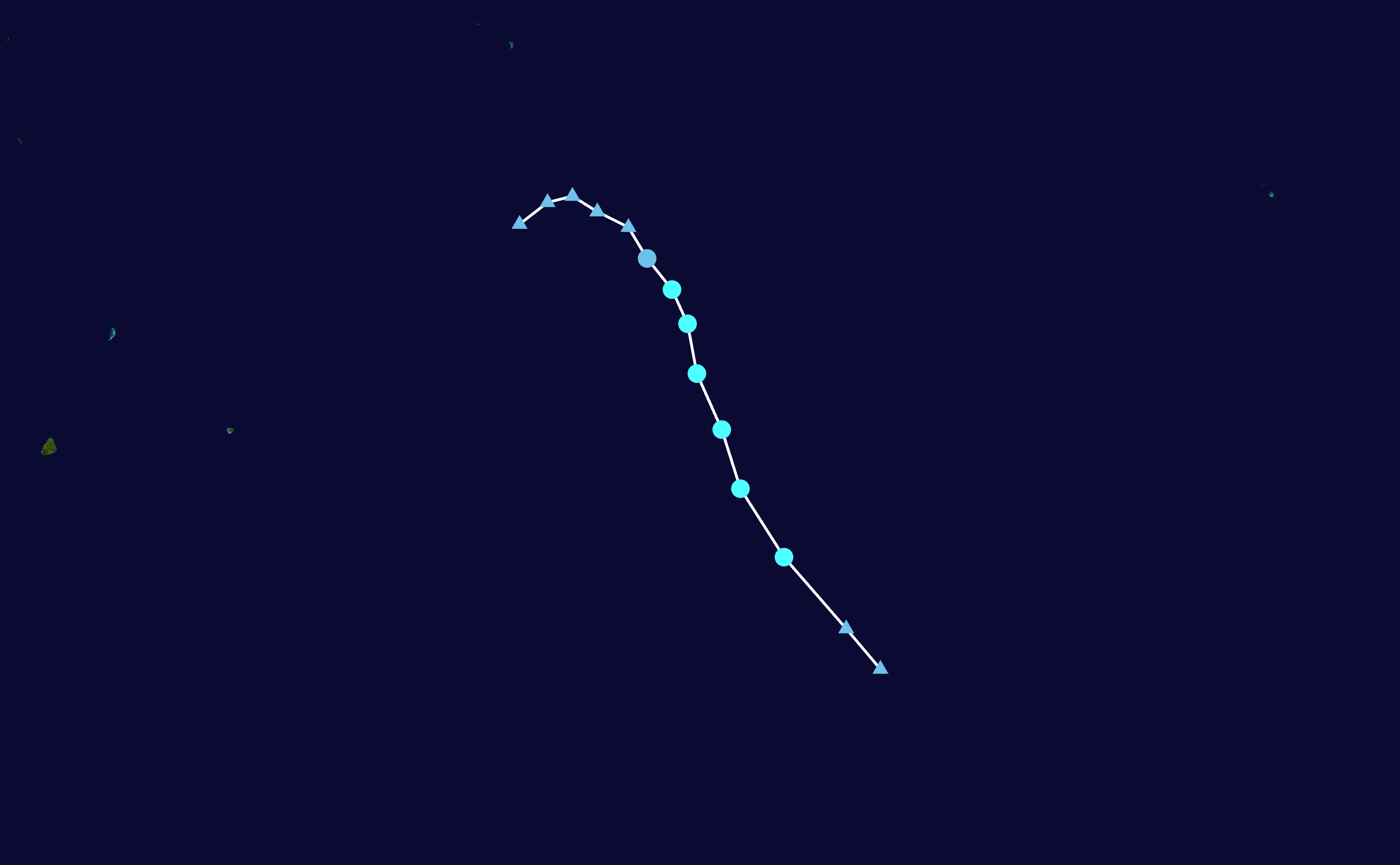
- Duration: March 28 – March 30
- Peak intensity: 85 km/h (50 mph) (10-min); 993 hPa (mbar)

A tropical disturbance formed in the central Indian Ocean, 770 km (480 mi) south-southeast of Diego Garcia on March 28. The disturbance intensified into a tropical depression and was pushed quickly to the southeast ahead of a trough, away from the British Indian Ocean Territory. Having been previously analyzed as a tropical depression throughout its lifetime, Météo-France noted that 07 intensified into a moderate tropical storm the same day. Moderate Tropical Storm 07 briefly attained peak maximum sustained winds of 85 km/h (50 mph) the next day before strong wind shear pummelled the system, resulting in swift weakening and a prompt transition into a post-tropical depression on March 30.

=== Very Intense Tropical Cyclone Fantala ===
- Very intense tropical cyclone (MFR)
- Category 5 tropical cyclone (SSHWS)
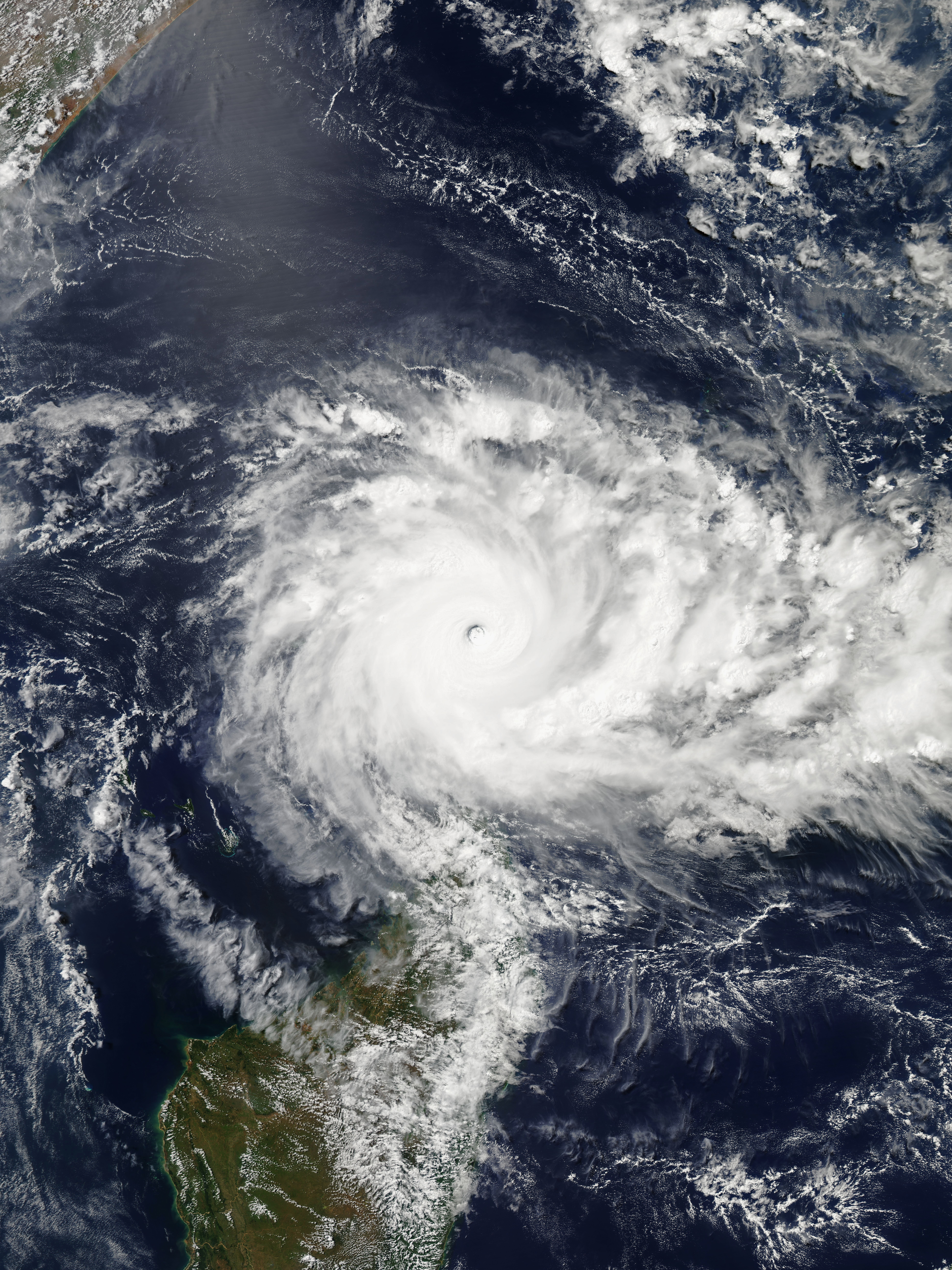
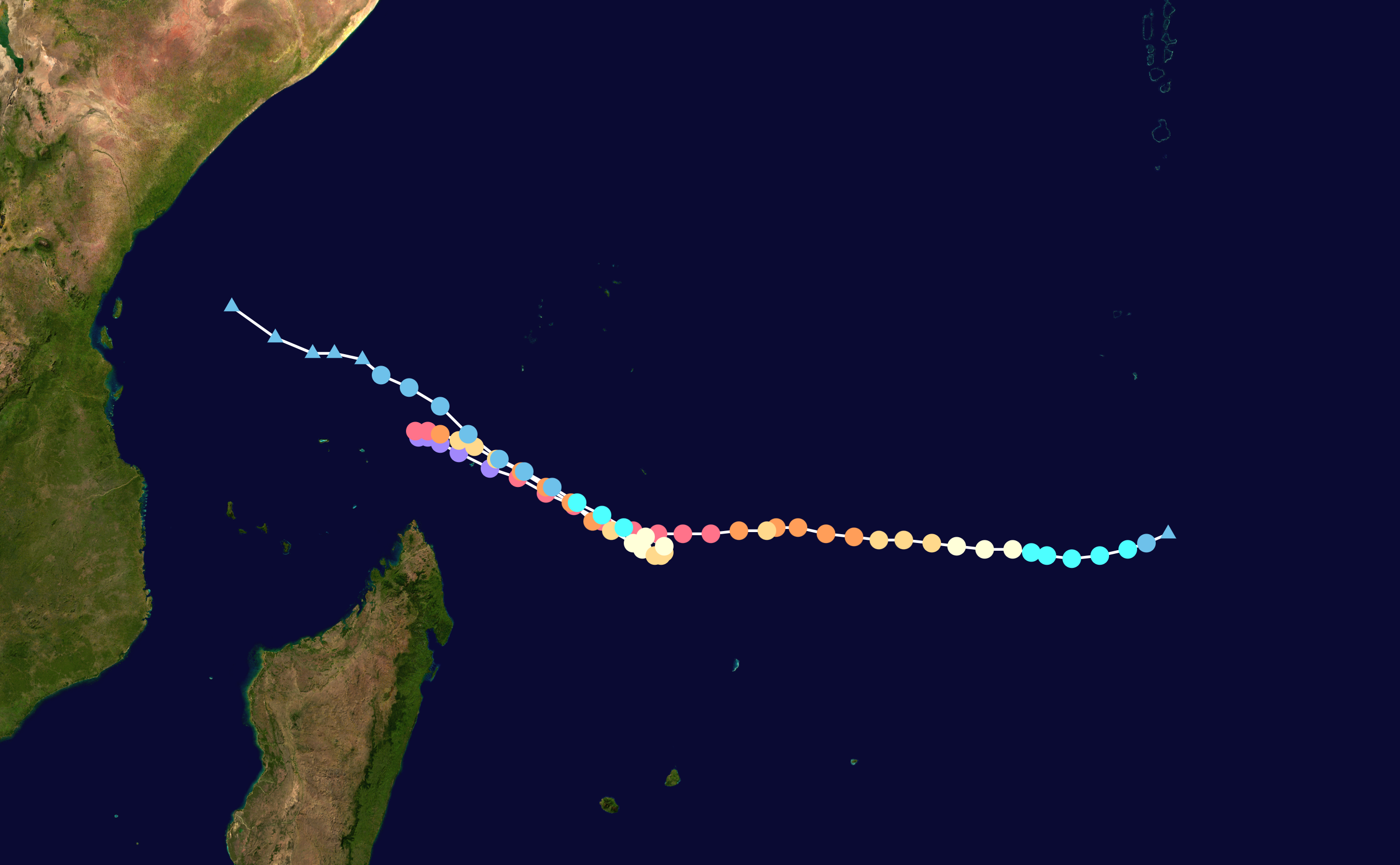
- Duration: April 11 – April 26
- Peak intensity: 250 km/h (155 mph) (10-min); 910 hPa (mbar)

Fantala formed on April 11 to the south of Diego Garcia. With a ridge to the south, the storm moved westward for several days while gaining strength, aided by warm waters and decreasing wind shear. Late on April 17, the MFR estimated peak 10-minute sustained winds of 250 km/h (155 mph), the highest on record in the basin. Meanwhile, the JTWC estimated peak 1-minute sustained winds of 285 km/h (180 mph), surpassing Cyclone Agnielle from November 1995 as the strongest cyclone on record in the south-west Indian Ocean in terms of wind speed. The system weakened due to an eyewall replacement cycle, and a change of steering currents caused Fantala to reverse direction and accelerate southeast. This brought the cyclone over cooler waters previously upwelled by itself, causing further weakening. Between April 19 and 23, Fantala fluctuated in intensity. At first, the eye became more pronounced, but wind shear soon caused weakening to resume. By April 22, Fantala stalled again due to a building ridge to its south. Fantala accelerated back northwest as a moderate tropical cyclone, with the JTWC and MFR issuing their final advisories on April 24. The remnants of Fantala continued northwest toward the East African coast.

Evacuations were initiated on Agaléga ahead of Cyclone Fantala. While near peak intensity, the cyclone also passed near the Farquhar Group of the Seychelles, damaging most of the buildings in the small archipelago. The islands were declared a disaster area by Seychelles officials. After dissipation, Fantala's remnant moisture affected Tanzania and Kenya, where heavy rains and flooding killed 13 people and left 13,933 homeless. Eight people were killed in the Kilimanjaro Region where flooding entered buildings and trapped hundreds of residents. In the Morogoro Region, five people drowned in flooded rivers.

== Storm names ==
Within the South-West Indian Ocean, tropical depressions and subtropical depressions that are judged to have 10-minute sustained wind of at least 65 km/h (40 mph) by the Regional Specialized Meteorological Center on La Réunion Island, France (RSMC La Réunion) are usually assigned a name. However, it is the Sub-Regional Tropical Cyclone Advisory Centers in Mauritius and Madagascar who name the systems. The Sub-Regional Tropical Cyclone Advisory Center in Mauritius names a storm should it intensify into a moderate tropical storm between 55°E and 90°E. If a storm should intensify into a moderate tropical storm between 30°E and 55°E then the Sub-Regional Tropical Cyclone Advisory Center in Madagascar assigns the appropriate name to the storm. New name lists are used every year, and a name is normally only used once, so there are currently no retired names, however should a name go unused during a season, the name could be re-used in future seasons.

- Annabelle
- Bohale
- Corentin
- Daya
- Emeraude
- Fantala
- Gao (unused)
- Hassina (unused)
- Inacio (unused)
- Juma (unused)
- Ketiwe (unused)
- Lalelani (unused)
- Moabi (unused)
- Naima (unused)
- Octave (unused)
- Piera (unused)
- Quizito (unused)
- Richard (unused)
- Sofia (unused)
- Tatiana (unused)
- Umboni (unused)
- Vela (unused)
- Wayne (unused)
- Xaba (unused)
- Yazid (unused)
- Zenani (unused)

== Seasonal effects ==
This table lists all of the tropical cyclones and subtropical cyclones that were monitored during the 2015–2016 South-West Indian Ocean cyclone season. Information on their intensity, duration, name, areas affected, primarily comes from RSMC La Réunion. Death and damage reports come from either press reports or the relevant national disaster management agency while the damage totals are given in 2015 or 2016 USD.

Name	Dates	Peak intensity			Areas affected	Damage (USD)	Deaths	Ref(s).
Name	Dates	Category	Wind speed	Pressure	Areas affected	Damage (USD)	Deaths	Ref(s).
Annabelle	November 19–23	Severe tropical storm	100 km/h (65 mph)	983 hPa (29.03 inHg)	None	None	None	
Bohale	December 9–12	Moderate tropical storm	65 km/h (40 mph)	995 hPa (29.38 inHg)	None	None	None	
Corentin	January 20–24	Severe tropical storm	110 km/h (70 mph)	975 hPa (28.79 inHg)	None	None	None	
Daya	February 8–12	Moderate tropical storm	65 km/h (40 mph)	990 hPa (29.23 inHg)	Madagascar, Réunion, Mauritius	Unknown	None	
Uriah	February 14–19	Intense tropical cyclone	205 km/h (125 mph)	925 hPa (27.32 inHg)	None	None	None	
Emeraude	March 15–21	Intense tropical cyclone	205 km/h (125 mph)	940 hPa (27.76 inHg)	None	None	None	
Seven	March 28–30	Moderate tropical storm	85 km/h (50 mph)	993 hPa (29.32 inHg)	None	None	None	
Fantala	April 11–23	Very intense tropical cyclone	250 km/h (155 mph)	910 hPa (26.87 inHg)	Agaléga, Seychelles, Madagascar, Tanzania	$4.5 million	13	
Season aggregates
8 systems	November 19, 2015 – April 23, 2016		250 km/h (155 mph)	910 hPa (26.87 inHg)		$4.5 million	13	

== See also ==
- Weather of 2015 and 2016
- Tropical cyclones in 2015 and 2016
- List of Southern Hemisphere tropical cyclone seasons
- Atlantic hurricane seasons: 2015, 2016
- Pacific hurricane seasons: 2015, 2016
- Pacific typhoon seasons: 2015, 2016
- North Indian Ocean cyclone seasons: 2015, 2016
- 2015–16 Australian region cyclone season
- 2015–16 South Pacific cyclone season
- South Atlantic tropical cyclone
