= 1910s Australian region cyclone seasons =

Seasonal boundaries
- First system formed: 1910
- Last system dissipated: 1920

Seasonal statistics
- Total fatalities: Unknown
- Total damage: Unknown

The cyclone seasons of the Australia region during the 1910s.

== 1910–11 cyclone season ==
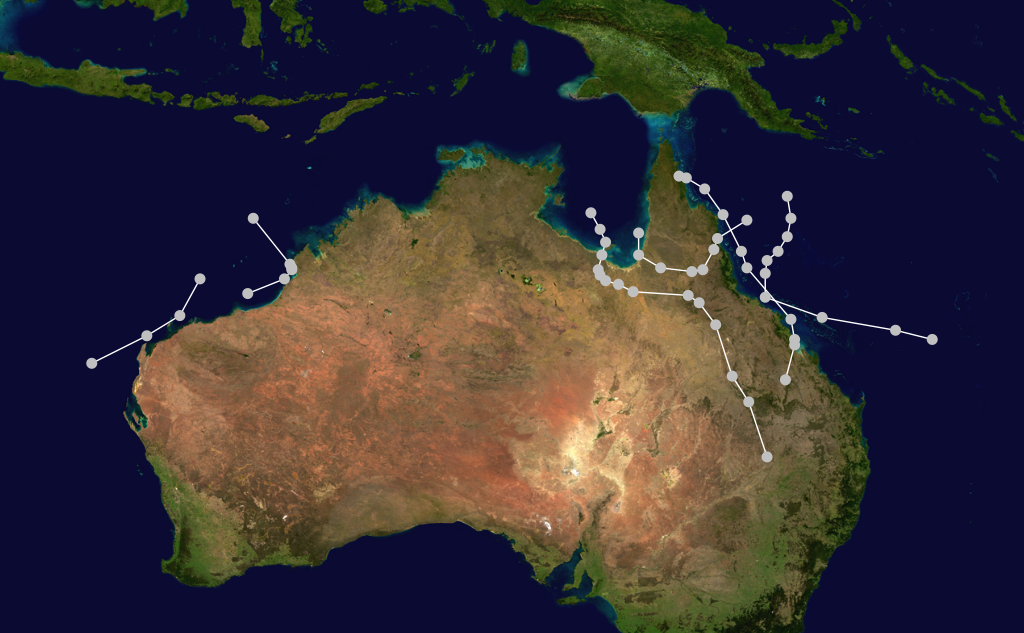
Track map of the whole season

=== Cyclone 1 (1910) ===
A cyclone hit Queensland, Australia near the city of Cairns.

=== Cyclone 1 ===
On 19 November 1910, a cyclone touched land in Western Australia when it had a minimum pressure of 965 hPa. It passed directly over Broome, where there was much damage. Twenty six boats of the pearling fleet were sunk and 40 people died.

=== Cyclone 2 ===
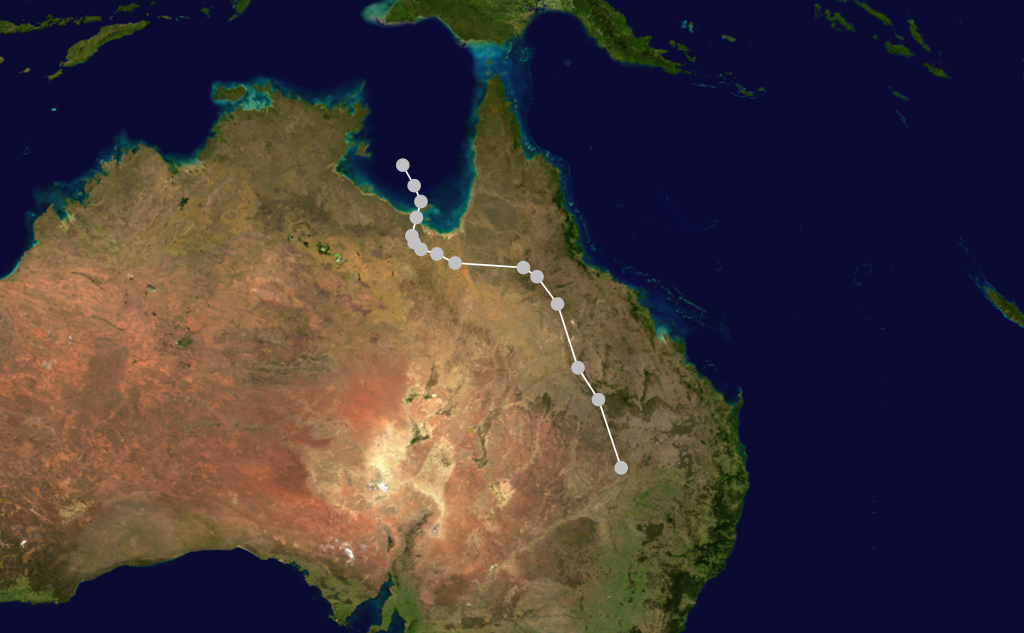
Track of Cyclone #2

A long-lived weak cyclone formed in the Gulf of Carpentaria on 3 January, and made landfall with a pressure of 996 hPa.

=== Cyclone 3 ===
On 4 January 1911 a cyclone affected the Pilbara coast between Cossack and Onslow. The steel-hulled sailing ship Glenbank was wrecked off Legendre Island with the loss of all but one of its crew. The cyclone crossed near Mardie Station where nearly every outbuilding was levelled to the ground and 6000-gallon tanks were blown away.

=== Cyclone 4 ===
This cyclone affected Queensland.

=== Cyclone 5 ===
Cyclone 5 crossed the Cape York Peninsula.

=== Cyclone 6 ===
This cyclone approached the Queensland coast near Townsville, Australia, but took a sharp turn away from the coast on 22 March.

=== Cyclone 7 ===
The cyclone came ashore between Cape Upstart and Cape Bowling Green. The ship Yongala was completely destroyed, with the loss of all 120 people on board.

== 1911–12 cyclone season ==
=== Unnamed tropical cyclone near Port Hedland (1912) ===
This cyclone crossed the coast just west of Balla Balla near Port Hedland and claimed well over 150 lives. It is almost certainly Australia's worst weather-related maritime disaster since Federation with the loss of the coastal steamer Koombana.Trove – Archived webpage

== 1917–18 cyclone season ==
=== 1918 Mackay cyclone ===
Wettest tropical cyclones and their remnants in Australia Highest-known totals
Precipitation			Storm	Location	Ref.
Rank	mm	in	Storm	Location	Ref.
1	2,252	88.66	Jasper 2023	Bairds	
2	1,947	76.65	Peter 1979	Mount Bellenden Ker	
3	1,870	73.62	Rona 1999	Mount Bellenden Ker	
4	1,318	51.89	Wanda 1974	Mount Glorious	
5	1,256.8	49.48	Fletcher 2014	Kowanyama	
6	1,111	43.74	Alfred 2025	Upper Springbrook	
7	1,082	42.60	Aivu 1989	Dalrymple Heights	
8	1,065	41.93	May 1998	Burketown	
9	1,000	39.37	Justin 1997	Willis Island	
10	1,000	39.37	Ellie 2009		

The 1918 Mackay cyclone struck the city of Mackay, Queensland, Australia on 20–21 January 1918. It remains one of the most destructive cyclones to strike a populated centre in Australia.

The eye of the storm passed to the north of the city just after sunrise on 21 January. During the height of the storm, barometric pressure was recorded at 932.6 hPa, one of the lowest recordings in Australia. However, the pressure was probably a lot lower, as the barometer would not go beyond 932.6 hPa, and the eye of the storm did not cross directly over Mackay where the measurement was taken. The meteorologist at the time stated that the barometer was at its maximum low reading for at least 30 minutes before the cyclone moved inland and away, allowing the pressure to finally rise. Few buildings in the centre of Mackay escaped without significant structural damage. The accompanying storm surge resulted in a sea-level-rise of 2.36 metres above the highest spring tide level, with one witness later recalling waves of 2–3 metres breaking in the main street.

Communication links into Mackay were destroyed. The outside world did not learn of the Mackay cyclone until five days after impact, leading to some speculation the city had been completely destroyed.

Record amounts of rainfall were recorded in Mackay, the totals to 9 a.m. are as follows:

- 22 Jan – 627mm
- 23 Jan – 438mm
- 24 Jan – 346mm
- Total rainfall for January – 2161mm

The rainfall resulted in the Pioneer River's highest flood level at the time, which took 2 weeks to subside.

Damage wasn't limited to Mackay. In Rockhampton, over 350 km south of Mackay, houses lost their roofs and solid jacaranda trees were uprooted. Extensive structural damage was also reported in Yeppoon and Mount Morgan. Rainfall associated with the cyclonic system was responsible for the big Rockhampton Flood of 1918 in February.

A total of thirty people perished in the disaster, including two in Rockhampton and another in Yeppoon.

=== 1918 Innisfail cyclone ===
The 1918 Innisfail cyclone made landfall in the area around Innisfail, Queensland, Australia on 10 March 1918. It was more severe than the earlier Mackay storm. Only 12 houses survived being unroofed or totally destroyed. Damage was also sustained in Cairns, 100 km to the north, and inland to the Atherton Tableland. A 3.6m storm surge was experienced to the south at Mission Beach. 37 people were killed in Innisfail, and an estimated 40 to 60 more in outlying areas. The lowest pressure recorded was 926hPa, but again, damage to recording equipment meant that no accurate minimum for the storm's center survived. Estimates place the figure below 910hPa.

Following this destruction, the area experienced a period of prosperity in the local agricultural industries. This led to the construction of many buildings in a grand art-deco style.

== See also ==
- 1900–1940 South Pacific cyclone seasons
- 1900–1950 South-West Indian Ocean cyclone seasons
- Atlantic hurricane seasons: 1910, 1911, 1912, 1913, 1914, 1915, 1916, 1917, 1918, 1919
- Eastern Pacific hurricane seasons: 1910, 1911, 1912, 1913, 1914, 1915, 1916, 1917, 1918, 1919
- Western Pacific typhoon seasons: 1910, 1911, 1912, 1913, 1934, 1915, 1916, 1917, 1918, 1919
- North Indian Ocean cyclone seasons: 1910, 1911, 1912, 1913, 1914, 1915, 1916, 1917, 1918, 1919
