= List of Category 3 Australian region severe tropical cyclones =

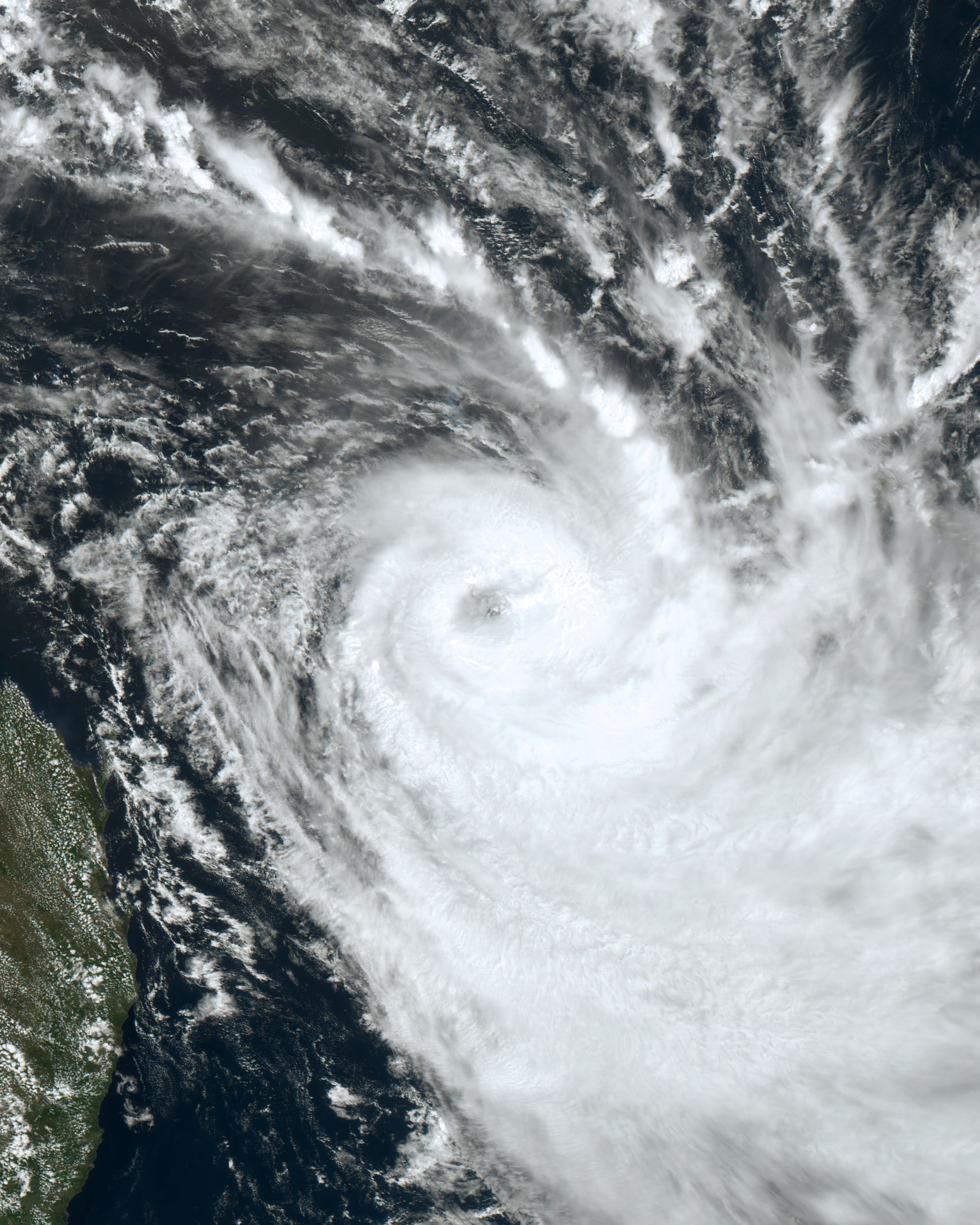
Cyclone Gabrielle

Category 3 is the third-highest classification on the Australian tropical cyclone intensity scale which is used to classify tropical cyclones. Under the Australian tropical cyclone intensity scale, Category 3 cyclones are characterised by sustained wind speeds of 118–159 km/h with gusts of 165–224 km/h.

== Systems ==
Name	Duration	Peak intensity		Areas affected	Damage (USD)	Deaths	Refs
Name	Duration	Wind speed	Pressure	Areas affected	Damage (USD)	Deaths	Refs
Flora	1 – 5 December 1964	140 km/h (85 mph)	965 hPa (28.50 inHg)	Northern Territory, Queensland	Extensive	None	
Ada	17 – 18 January 1970	150 km/h (90 mph)	965 hPa (28.50 inHg)	Solomon Islands			
Gertie; Fiona	10 – 28 February 1971	150 km/h (90 mph)	960 hPa (28.35 inHg)	Northern Territory, Queensland		None	
Althea	22 - 24 December 1971	130 km/h (80 mph)	965 hPa (28.50 inHg)	Queensland	$18.5 million	3	
Daisy	10 - 12 February 1972	120 km/h (75 mph)	945 hPa (27.91 inHg)	Queensland	$1.48 million	None	
Emily	30 March – 2 April 1972	155 km/h (100 mph)	945 hPa (27.91 inHg)	Queensland		8	
Gail	15 April 1972	155 km/h (100 mph)	945 hPa (27.91 inHg)				
Hannah	11 May 1972	130 km/h (80 mph)	965 hPa (28.50 inHg)	Solomon Islands, Papua New Guinea			
Jean	12 - 14 January 1973	150 km/h (90 mph)	964 hPa (28.47 inHg)				
Adeline	28–29 January 1973	130 km/h (80 mph)	970 hPa (28.64 inHg)				
Kristy	25 – 27 February 1970	120 km/h (75 mph)	975 hPa (28.79 inHg)				
Nellie	15 – 18 March 1970	150 km/h (90 mph)	964 hPa (28.47 inHg)				
Flores	28 – 30 April 1973	150 km/h (90 mph)	950 hPa (28.05 inHg)	Indonesia		1653	
Marcelle	1 – 3 May 1973	130 km/h (80 mph)	973 hPa (28.73 inHg)	South-Western Australia	None	None	
Ines (1973)
Beryl (1973)
Cecily (1973)
Deidre-Delida (1973)
Helen (1974)
Zoe (1974)
Isobel (1974)
Jessie (1974)
Selma (1974)
Ray (1975)
David	13 – 19 January 1976	155 km/h (100 mph)	961 hPa (28.38 inHg)	Queensland	N/A	None	
Beth	13–22 February 1976	130 km/h (80 mph)	965 hPa (28.50 inHg)	Queensland	$3.13 million	None	
Wally (1976)
Colin (1976)
Irene (1977)
Jack-Io (1977)
Karen (1977)
Verna	28 April – 3 May 1977	140 km/h (85 mph)	973 hPa (28.73 inHg)	Northern Territory	None	None	
Vern (1978)
Peter (1978–79)
Rosa (1979)
Wilf-Danitza (1979–80)
Freda	1981	130 km/h (80 mph)					
Max	1981	155 km/h (100 mph)					
Paddy	25 – 30 May 1981	120 km/h (75 mph)	973 hPa (28.73 inHg)	Western Australia	None	None	
Alex	19 – 27 October 1981	150 km/h (90 mph)	964 hPa (28.47 inHg)	None	None		
Ian (1982)
Ken (1983)
Lena (1983)
Naomi	21 April – 2 May 1983		150 km/h (90 mph)	960 hPa (28.35 inHg)	None	None	
Monty (1983)
Oscar	22 October – 1 November 1983	140 km/h (85 mph)	968 hPa (28.59 inHg)	None	None	None	
Grace (1984)
Vivienne-Fanja (1984)
Willy (1984)
Annette-Jaminy (1984)
Ingrid (1984)
Jim (1984)
Emma (1984)
Frank (1984)
Hubert (1985)
Isobel (1985)
Jacob (1985)
Lindsay (1985)
Margot	10 – 25 April 1985	155 km/h (100 mph)	942 hPa (27.82 inHg)	Western Australia	N/A	None	
Nicholas (1985)
Winifred	27 January – 5 February 1986	155 km/h (100 mph)	957 hPa (28.26 inHg)	Queensland	$130 million	2	
Rhonda (1986)
Manu	21–27 April 1986	130 km/h (80 mph)	970 hPa (28.64 inHg)	Papua New Guinea, Queensland	Extensive	None	
Namu (1986)
Connie	15 – 23 January 1987	155 km/h (100 mph)	950 hPa (28.05 inHg)	Western Australia	N/A	None	
Jason	5 - 14 February 1987	140 km/h (85 mph)	970 hPa (28.64 inHg)	Gulf of Carpentaria		None	
Frederic (1988)
Charlie	21 February – 1 March 1988	150 km/h (90 mph)	972 hPa (28.70 inHg)	Queensland		1	
Ilona	12 – 19 December 1988	150 km/h (90 mph)	960 hPa (28.35 inHg)	Western Australia	$741,800	None	
Kirrily (1989)

== 1990s ==
Name	Duration	Peak intensity		Areas affected	Damage (USD)	Deaths	Refs
Name	Duration	Wind speed	Pressure	Areas affected	Damage (USD)	Deaths	Refs
Felicity	13 – 20 December 1989	140 km/h (85 mph)	970 hPa (28.64 inHg)	Cape York Peninsula	Minor	None	
Sam (1990)
Vincent (1990)
Daman	17 – 19 February 1992	120 km/h (75 mph)	965 hPa (28.50 inHg)				
Fran	11 – 17 March 1992	140 km/h (85 mph)	950 hPa (28.05 inHg)	Tokelau, Tuvalu, Vanuatu, New Caledonia; Eastern Australia, New Zealand			
Polly (1993)
Adel	13 – 16 May	120 km/h (75 mph)	970 hPa (28.64 inHg)	Papua New Guinea	Minimal	3	
Naomi	15 – 18 December 1993	150 km/h (90 mph)	960 hPa (28.35 inHg)	Western Australia	N/A	None	
Pearl-Farah (1994	11 – 21 January 1994	155 km/h (100 mph)	960 hPa (28.35 inHg)	None	None	None	
Quenton	22 – 29 January 1994	150 km/h (90 mph)	955 hPa (28.20 inHg)	None	None	None	
Vivienne (1994)
Violet (1995)
Warren	4 – 6 March 1995	150 km/h (90 mph)	960 hPa (28.35 inHg)	Queensland, Northern Territory	N/A	None	
Daryl-Agnielle (1995)
Gertie	17 – 22 December 1995	140 km/h (85 mph)	965 hPa (28.50 inHg)	Australia	N/A	None	
Hubert-Coryna (1996)
Celeste	26 – 29 January 1996	130 km/h (80 mph)	965 hPa (28.50 inHg)	Queensland	N/A	None	
Jacob (1996)
Fergus	23 December 1996 – 1 January 1997	155 km/h (100 mph)	955 hPa (28.20 inHg)	Solomon Islands, New Zealand	N/A	4	
Rachel	3 – 8 January 1997	130 km/h (80 mph)	965 hPa (28.50 inHg)	Northern Territory, Western Australia	Minor	None	
Justin	6 – 24 March 1997	150 km/h (90 mph)	955 hPa (28.20 inHg)	Papua New Guinea, Queensland	$190 million	37	
Selwyn (1997–98)
Victor–Cindy (1998)
Alison (1998)
Billy (1998)
Damien-Birenda (1999)
Rona	10 – 21 February 1999	140 km/h (85 mph)	970 hPa (28.64 inHg)	Eastern Australia, New Caledonia	$150 million	7	

== 2000s ==
Name	Duration	Peak intensity		Areas affected	Damage (USD)	Deaths	Refs
Name	Duration	Wind speed	Pressure	Areas affected	Damage (USD)	Deaths	Refs
Kirrily	24 January – 2 February 2000	140 km/h (85 mph)	975 hPa (28.79 inHg)	None	None	None	
Leon – Eline	1 – 8 February 2000	140 km/h (85 mph)	960 hPa (28.35 inHg)	Madagascar, Southern Africa			
Tessi	1 – 3 April 2000	130 km/h (80 mph)	980 hPa (28.94 inHg)	Queensland	$60 million	None	
Abigail	23 February – 8 March 2001	120 km/h (75 mph)	970 hPa (28.64 inHg)	Queensland, Northern Territory, Western Australia			
Walter (2001)
Claudia (2002)
Dianne-Jery (2002)
Erica (2003)
Jana	16 – 23 December 2003	120 km/h (75 mph)	970 hPa (28.64 inHg)	Northern Territory		None	
Debbie	16 – 23 December 2003	120 km/h (75 mph)	970 hPa (28.64 inHg)	Northern Territory		None	
Kerry (2005)
Harvey	3 – 7 February 2005	140 km/h (85 mph)	967 hPa (28.56 inHg)	Northern Territory	N/A	None	
Willy (2005)
Adeline-Juliet (2005)
Clare	6 – 10 January 2006	140 km/h (85 mph)	960 hPa (28.35 inHg)	Western Australia	$2.35 million	None	
Jim (2006)
Wati (2006)
Jacob (2007)
Kara (2007)

== 2010s ==
Name	Duration	Peak intensity		Areas affected	Damage (USD)	Deaths	Refs
Name	Duration	Wind speed	Pressure	Areas affected	Damage (USD)	Deaths	Refs
Guba	11 - 20 November 2007	120 km/h (75 mph)	971 hPa (28.67 inHg)	Papua New Guinea	Unknown	Unknown	
Nicholas	11 - 20 February 2008	150 km/h (90 mph)	948 hPa (27.99 inHg)	Western Australia	Unknown	Unknown	
Magda	18 – 24 January 2010	130 km/h (80 mph)	975 hPa (28.79 inHg)	Western Australia	Unknown	Unknown	
Paul	24 March – 2 April 2010	130 km/h (80 mph)	971 hPa (28.67 inHg)	Northern Territory	Unknown	Unknown	
Dianne	14 – 22 February 2011	140 km/h (85 mph)	960 hPa (28.35 inHg)	Western Australia	Unknown	Unknown	
Carlos	15 – 26 February 2011	120 km/h (75 mph)	969 hPa (28.61 inHg)	Northern Territory, Western Australia	Unknown	Unknown	
Errol	13 – 20 April 2011	120 km/h (75 mph)	985 hPa (29.09 inHg)	Timor	Unknown	Unknown	
Alenga	2 – 9 December 2011	140 km/h (85 mph)	972 hPa (28.70 inHg)	None	None	None	
Heidi	9 – 13 January 2012	150 km/h (90 mph)	960 hPa (28.35 inHg)	Western Australia	Unknown	Unknown	
Lua	10 – 18 March 2012	155 km/h (100 mph)	935 hPa (27.61 inHg)	Western Australia	$230 million	None	}
Freda	28 – 29 December 2012	150 km/h (90 mph)	964 hPa (28.47 inHg)	Solomon Islands, New Caledonia	Unknown	Unknown	
Sandra	5 – 10 March 2013	155 km/h (100 mph)	958 hPa (28.29 inHg)	New Caledonia	Unknown	Unknown	
Victoria	6 – 12 April 2013	140 km/h (85 mph)	968 hPa (28.59 inHg)	None	None	None	
Zane	28 April – 1 May 2013	120 km/h (75 mph)	981 hPa (28.97 inHg)	Papua New Guinea, Queensland	None	None	
Bruce	16 – 19 December 2013	155 km/h (100 mph)	959 hPa (28.32 inHg)	Cocos Islands	None	None	
Jack	16 – 22 April 2014	140 km/h (85 mph)	966 hPa (28.53 inHg)	None	None	None	
Kate	21 - 30 December 2014	150 km/h (90 mph)	967 hPa (28.56 inHg)	None	None	None	
Olwyn	8 – 14 March 2015	140 km/h (85 mph)	955 hPa (28.20 inHg)	Western Australia	Unknown	Unknown	
Frances	21 April – 1 May 2017	130 km/h (80 mph)	978 hPa (28.88 inHg)	New Guinea, Timor, Indonesia	Unknown	Unknown	
Kelvin	11 – 21 February 2018	150 km/h (90 mph)	955 hPa (28.20 inHg)	Top End, Western Australia, South Australia	Unknown	Unknown	
Nora	19 – 26 March 2018	155 km/h (100 mph)	958 hPa (28.29 inHg)	New Guinea, Northern Territory, Queensland	Unknown	Unknown	
Owen	30 November - 20 December 2018	120 km/h (75 mph)	958 hPa (28.29 inHg)	Papua New Guinea, Queensland, Northern Territory	Unknown	Unknown	
Riley	19 - 30 January 2019	130 km/h (80 mph)	971 hPa (28.67 inHg)	Western Australia	Unknown	Unknown	

== 2020s ==
Name	Duration	Peak intensity		Areas affected	Damage (USD)	Deaths	Refs
Name	Duration	Wind speed	Pressure	Areas affected	Damage (USD)	Deaths	Refs
Claudia	5 – 12 January 2020	150 km/h (90 mph)	963 hPa (28.44 inHg)	Northern Territory, Western Australia	Unknown	Unknown	
Damien	3 – 9 February 2020	155 km/h (100 mph)	955 hPa (28.20 inHg)	Northern Territory, Western Australia	Unknown	Unknown	
Seroja	3 – 12 April 2021	120 km/h (75 mph)	967 hPa (28.56 inHg)	East Timor, Indonesia, Western Australia	Unknown	>150	
Gabrielle	5 – 10 February 2023	150 km/h (90 mph)	959 hPa (28.32 inHg)	Solomon Islands, Norfolk Island, New Zealand			
Anggrek	10 – 25 January 2024	140 km/h (85 mph)	973 hPa (28.73 inHg)	None	None	None	
Kirrily	12 – 25 January 2024	120 km/h (75 mph)	978 hPa (28.88 inHg)	Queensland	Unknown	None	
Taliah	31 January – 12 February 2025	140 km/h (85 mph)	964 hPa (28.47 inHg)	None	None	None	
Vince	31 January – 4 February 2025	140 km/h (85 mph)	970 hPa (28.64 inHg)	None	None	None	
