= List of Queensland tropical cyclones =

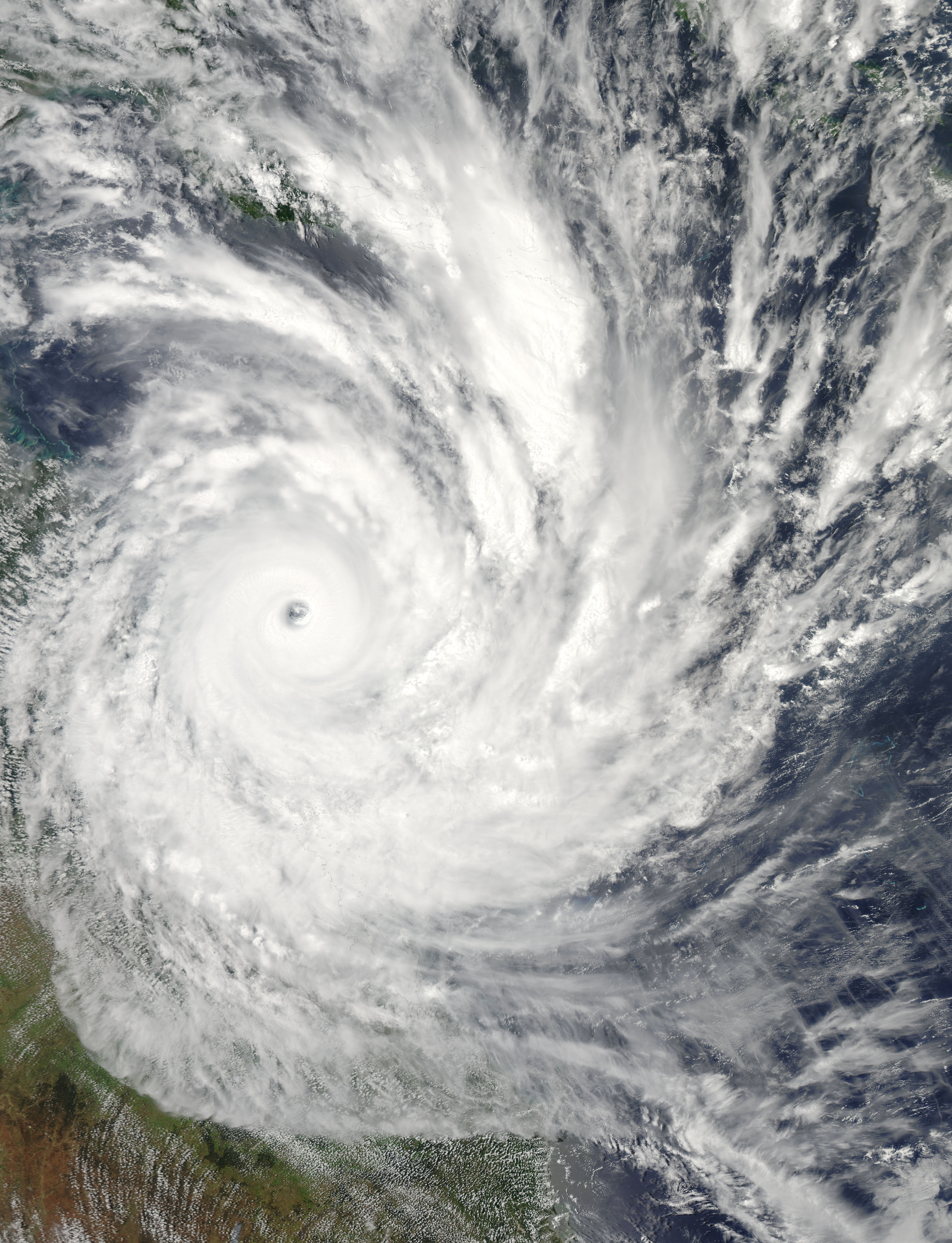
Satellite image of Cyclone Yasi in 2011 nearing landfall in Queensland, Australia

Australian tropical cyclone intensity scale
Category	Sustained winds	Gusts
Five	>107 kn (198 km/h; 123 mph)	>151 kn (280 km/h; 174 mph)
Four	86–107 kn (159–198 km/h; 99–123 mph)	122–151 kn (226–280 km/h; 140–174 mph)
Three	64–85 kn (119–157 km/h; 74–98 mph)	90–121 kn (167–224 km/h; 104–139 mph)
Two	48–63 kn (89–117 km/h; 55–72 mph)	68–89 kn (126–165 km/h; 78–102 mph)
One	34–47 kn (63–87 km/h; 39–54 mph)	49–67 kn (91–124 km/h; 56–77 mph)

The state of Queensland in northeastern Australia regularly experiences the effects of tropical cyclones, including powerful winds, torrential rainfall, storm surge flooding, and high waves. Australia's deadliest storm, Cyclone Mahina, made landfall along the Cape York Peninsula, killing at least 307 people. The state is also the location for the wettest tropical cyclone in Australia, which was Cyclone Jasper; the cyclone dropped over 2 m (79 in) of precipitation, leading to significant flooding.

== List ==
=== Pre-1900 ===
- 3–4 March 1867 – Unnamed cyclone hit Townsville
- 20 February 1870 – Unnamed cyclone hits Townsville
- 5 March 1887 – Unnamed cyclone hits Burketown
- 26–27 January 1896 – Cyclone Sigma
- 4 March 1899 – Cyclone Mahina struck Bathurst Bay along Cape York Peninsula. The cyclone wrecked four schooners, killing 307 people and becoming the deadliest on record in Australia. While moving ashore, the cyclone produced a storm surge of 12 m (39 ft).

=== 1900s ===
- 9 March 1903 – Cyclone Leonta
- 19 January 1907 – Unnamed cyclone hits Cooktown and causes nine fatalities
- 16 March 1911 – Unnamed cyclone affected Port Douglas and Cairns
- March 1911 – Unnamed cyclone sunk the SS Yongala off the North Queensland coast
- 10 March 1918 – Unnamed cyclone that hit Innisfail
- 12 March 1934 – Unnamed cyclone hits Cape Tribulation causing 75 deaths
- 18 February 1940 – Unnamed cyclone hits Townsville with 8 fatalities from a sinking boat
- 2 March 1949 – Unnamed cyclone hits Gladstone and Rockhampton resulting in 4 fatalities
- 20 February 1954 – The Great Gold coast cyclone caused 26 fatalities across south-east Queensland and Northern New South Wales
- 7 March 1955 – Unnamed cyclone hits Mackay
- 6 March 1956 – Cyclone Agnes hits Townsville
- January 1964 – Cyclone Audrey
- April 1967 – Cyclone Glenda affected Brisbane and the Gold Coast but did not make landfall. Not to be confused with Cyclone Glenda, which struck Western Australia in 2006.
- January 1970 – Cyclone Ada
- 24 December 1971 – Cyclone Althea
- March 1972 – Cyclone Emily caused flooding in Kingaroy and Brisbane
- 24 January 1974 – Cyclone Wanda struck southeastern Queensland near Maryborough, and proceeded to drop torrential rainfall. Mount Glorious recorded a total of 1,318 mm (51.9 in) over five days. The rains led to floods that killed 16 people and inundated more than 6,700 homes. Damage reached $68 million (1974 AUD).
- 3 March 1974 – Cyclone Zoe struck southeastern Queensland near Coolangatta. It dropped heavy rainfall, flooding roads and houses.
- 31 December 1978 Cyclone Peter
- 19 March 1984 – Cyclone Kathy
- 27 January 1986 – Cyclone Winifred
- 4 April 1989 – Cyclone Aivu struck the Burdekin Shire.
- March 1992 – Cyclone Fran
- December 1992 to January 1993 Cyclone Nina
- 19 January 1994 – Cyclone Rewa
- 22 March 1997 – Cyclone Justin
- January 1998 – ex-Cyclone Sid causes 1998 Townsville floods
- January and February 1998 – Cyclones Katrina and Victor–Cindy
- 11 February 1999 – Cyclone Rona

=== 2000s ===
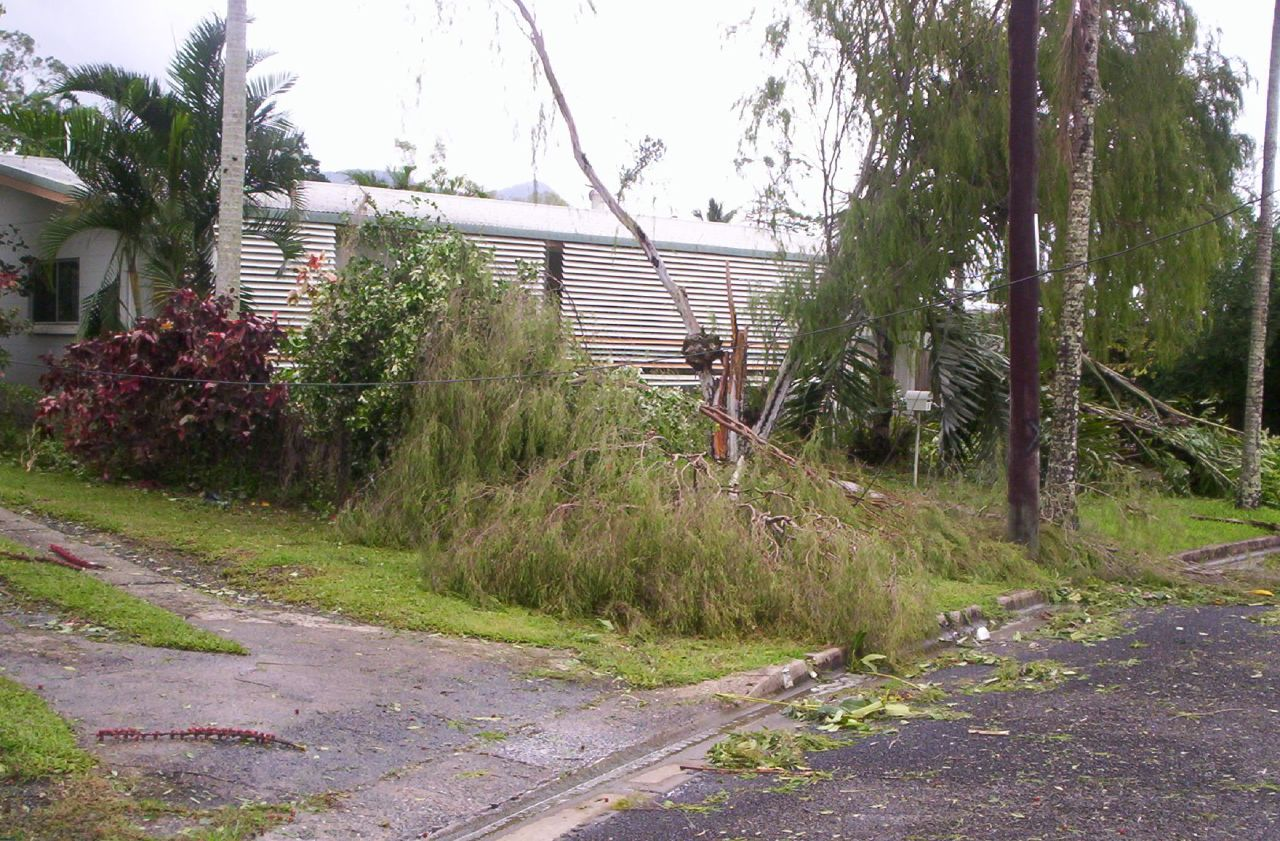
Vegetation damage from Cyclone Larry in 2006

- 27 February 2000 – Cyclone Steve made landfall just north of Cairns, producing floods that killed one person. Floods and high winds caused $11 million in damage in Queensland, while over 40,000 people lost power.
- 2 April 2000 – Cyclone Tessi moved ashore near Townsville, causing heavy rain and landslides that destroyed two houses. Damage totaled $15 million in Queensland.
- February 2001 – Cyclone Abigail moved across the Cape York peninsula, causing minor damage.
- 5 February 2003 – Rains from the remnants of Cyclone Beni produced flooding across Queensland, killing one person due to drowning.
- 10 March 2005 – Cyclone Ingrid crossed the Cape York peninsula in an unpopulated area as a small Category 4 cyclone. High winds knocked down trees in the area.
- 20 March 2006 – Cyclone Larry made landfall near Innisfail, where wind gusts reached 225 km/h (140 mph). Farther inland, the cyclone produced wind gusts of 294 km/h (183 mph) on Mount Bellenden Ker. Larry's winds, in conjunction with heavy rainfall, caused about $540 million in damage across Queensland, with 10,000 houses damaged.
- 19 April 2006 – Cyclone Monica struck Queensland south of Lockhart River as a Category 3 cyclone, damaging houses and trees.
- 6 February 2007 – Cyclone Nelson moved ashore from the Gulf of Carpentaria into a sparesely populated area of the Cape York peninsula, bringing heavy rainfall. Offshore, the cyclone forced a crew of 10 people to be evacuated from a barge.
- 12 January 2009 – Cyclone Charlotte hit northwestern Queensland near the mouth of the Gilbert River, producing heavy rainfall.
- 2 February 2009 – Cyclone Ellie moved ashore north of Cardwell, dropping torrential rainfall of more than 1 m (39 in) over a three day period.
- 4–11 March 2009 – Cyclone Hamish affected much of Queensaland's east coast with high waves, although the storm remained offshore. The waves capsized a boat near Swain Reefs, killing two people. High waves also swept cargo off a bulk carrier ship, leading to an oil spill along the coast.
- 26 January 2010 – The low that was formerly Cyclone Olga moved ashore Queensland south of Cairns, and later emerged into the Gulf of Carpentaria, where it restrengthened. Olga made a second landfall on 30 January in the Gulf Country. Rainfall totals in the region reached 400 mm (16 in).
- 21 March 2010 – Cyclone Ului made landfall near Airlie Beach as a Category 3 cyclone. The cyclone damaged houses and trees, leaving 50,000 people without power.
- 25 December 2010 – Cyclone Tasha moved ashore Queensland near Gordonvale as a Category 1 cyclone. It dropped heavy rainfall reaching 250 mm (9.8 in), which caused flooding that killed one person and inundated 100 homes.
- 30 January 2011 – Cyclone Anthony made landfall near Bowen, causing power outages that affected 11,415 homes.
- 2 February 2011 – Cyclone Yasi made landfall near Mission Beach as a Category 5 cyclone, with estimated wind gusts of 285 km/h (175 mph); this made Yasi one of the strongest cyclones on record in the state. The cyclone killed one person in the state and severely damaged more than 1,000 homes. Insured damage costs reached $1.41 billion.
- 21 January 2013 – Cyclone Oswald struck near Kowanyama along the western Cape York Peninsula. Although it weakened over land, the circulation moved southeastward through Queensland, producing heavy rainfall along its path that reached over 700 mm (28 in). Oswald killed at least six people in the state. Thousands of people were forced to evacuated, while power outages affected 283,000 buildings.
- 31 January 2014 – Cyclone Dylan produced beach erosion and high waves ahead of its landfall near Bowen.
- 10 March 2014 – Cyclone Gillian
- 20 March 2014 – Cyclone Nathan struck a sparsely populated region of northern Queensland as a Category 3 cyclone. It dropped more than 200 mm (7.9 in) of rainfall.

Cyclone Marcia making landfall as a Category 5 cyclone

- 11 April 2014 – Cyclone Ita struck northern Queensland near Cape Flattery, which recorded wind gusts of 160 km/h (99 mph). The cyclone damaged about 200 buildings and also produced widespread flooding.
- 12 February 2015 – Cyclone Lam
- 20 February 2015 – Cyclone Marcia made landfall in central Queensland in an unpopulated area near Shoalwater Bay as a small Category 5 cyclone. The high winds damaged trees and power lines, while accompanying heavy rainfall caused flooding. Total damage in Queensland reached A$750 million (US$587 million).
- 28 March 2017 – Cyclone Debbie struck northeastern Queensland near Airlie Beach as a Category 3 cyclone, producing wind gusts of 263 km/h (163 mph) on the offshore Hamilton Island. This was the highest wind gust ever recorded in Queensland. Debbie produced heavy rainfall that led to more than $1 billion in agriculture damage.
- 24 March 2018 – Cyclone Nora hit the west coast of the Cape York peninsula near Pormpuraaw as a Category 3 cyclone. Nora produced wind gusts of 100 km/h (62 mph), along with heavy rainfall that produced landslides.
- 12 December 2018 – Cyclone Owen made landfall in northern Queensland near Port Douglas, accompanied by flooding rains and winds strong enough to knock down trees. Owen moved across the Gulf of Carpentaria, struck the Northern Territories, and then reversed its track, hitting northwestern Queensland on 15 December. The remnant low dropped 681 mm (26.8 in) of rainfall in 24 hours at Halifax, causing additional damaging floods.
- 30 December 2018 – The precursor low to Cyclone Penny moved across the Cape York Peninsula, and the storm intensified in the Gulf of Carpentaria. Penny struck northwestern Queensland near Weipa, and after moving through the Coral Sea, the low later hit southeastern Queensland near Bowen. Penny dropped heavy rainfall along its path.
- 25 February 2019 – High waves from Cyclone Oma killed a surfer along North Stradbroke Island.
- 19 March 2019 – Cyclone Trevor made landfall in far northern Queensland near Lockhard River as a Category 4 cyclone. The town recorded wind gusts to 137 km/h (85 mph), which damaged houses and trees, while heavy rainfall caused floods.
- 15 May 2019 – The low that was previously Cyclone Ann struck the Cape York Peninsula, dropping 50 mm (2.0 in) of rainfall.
- 3 January 2021 – Cyclone Imogen struck northwestern Queensland from the Gulf of Carpentaria, producing heavy rainfall, high tides, and power outages.
- 1 March 2021 – In its developmental stages, Cyclone Niran affected northeastern Queensland with gale-force winds and heavy rainfall, which damaged crops and flooded low-lying areas.
- 29 December 2021 – The precursor low to Cyclone Seth moved across the Cape York Peninsula, with heavy rainfall closing roads. Later, Seth transitioned into a subtropical cyclone and struck southeastern Queensland near Hervey Bay, where it killed two people after causing additional flooding.
- 10 January 2022 – Cyclone Tiffany crossed the Cape York Peninsula and later moved across the Gulf of Carpentaria. The storm dropped heavy rainfall in Queensland reaching 170 mm (6.7 in).
- 13 December 2023 – Cyclone Jasper made landfall near Wujal Wujal in Far North Queensland, producing gusts to 130 km/h (81 mph) in Port Douglas. The cyclone stalled and weakened over the Cape York Peninsula, dropping over 2 m (79 in) of precipitation, making Jasper among the wettest tropical cyclones in Australia history. The rains produced widespread flooding and more than $1 billion in damage.
- 25 January 2024 – Cyclone Kirrily hit near the City of Townsville as a weakening storm, and stalled over land for several days before drifting toward the Gulf of Carpentaria. Mornington Island recorded gale-force winds on 1 February, before Kirrily turned back to the south and southeast. The storm dropped heavy rainfall, causing flooding that destroyed one home and damaged 251 others.
- 7 March 2025 – Cyclone Alfred moved ashore near Brisbane, killing one person. The cyclone left at least 287,000 people without power in the state.
- 10 January 2026 – Cyclone Koji struck central Queensland and produced widespread flooding. Several people required rescue.
- 19 March 2026 – Cyclone Narelle made landfall in Northern Queensland.

== Climatological statistics ==
Most tropical cyclones impacting Queensland do so in March.

Number of recorded storms affecting Queensland, by month of year
Month	Number of storms
January	10
February	8
March	13
April	3
May	1
November	0
December	5

Number of recorded storms affecting Queensland by time period
Period	Number of storms
Pre-1900	1
1970s	2
2000s	11
2010s	17
2020s	9

== Deadly cyclones ==
The following is a list of all known tropical cyclone-related deaths in Queensland.

Name	Year	Deaths
Mahina	1899	307
Wanda	1974	16
Oswald	2013	6
Seth	2021	2
Steve	2000	1
Beni	2003	1
Tasha	2010	1
Yasi	2011	1
Oma	2019	1
Alfred	2025	1

== See also ==
- List of Australia tropical cyclones

- List of Western Australia tropical cyclones
