= Cyclone Larry =

2006 tropical cyclone

Severe Tropical Cyclone Larry
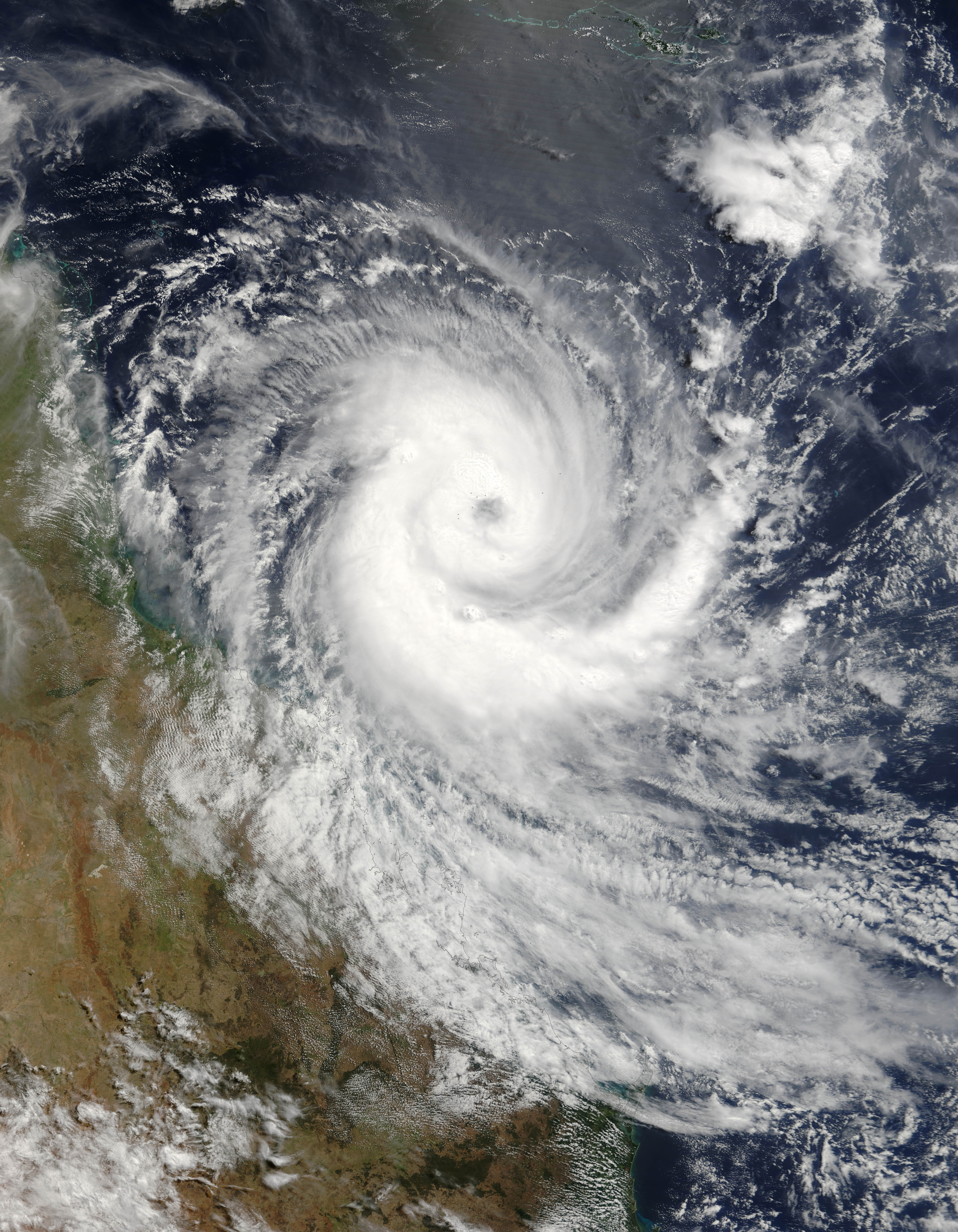
- Larry intensifying and approaching Queensland on 19 March

Meteorological history
- Formed: 18 March 2006
- Dissipated: 24 March 2006

Category 5 severe tropical cyclone
- 10-minute sustained (Aus)
- Highest winds: 205 km/h (125 mph)
- Lowest pressure: 949 hPa (mbar); 28.02 inHg

Category 4-equivalent tropical cyclone
- 1-minute sustained (SSHWS/JTWC)
- Highest winds: 215 km/h (130 mph)
- Lowest pressure: 937 hPa (mbar); 27.67 inHg

Overall effects
- Fatalities: 1 indirect
- Damage: $1.1 billion (2006 USD)
- Areas affected: Far North Queensland
- IBTrACS
- Part of the 2005–06 South Pacific and Australian region cyclone seasons

Severe Tropical Cyclone Larry was a tropical cyclone that made landfall in Australia during the 2005–06 Southern Hemisphere tropical cyclone season. Larry originated as a low pressure system over the eastern Coral Sea on 16 March 2006, and was monitored by the Australian Bureau of Meteorology in Brisbane, Australia. The low-pressure area organised into a tropical cyclone two days later and quickly strengthened into a Category 4 storm on the Australian tropical cyclone scale. Larry made landfall in Far North Queensland close to Innisfail, on 20 March 2006, as a Category 5 tropical cyclone on the Australian scale, with wind gusts reaching 240 kilometres per hour (150 mph), before dissipating over land several days later.

Throughout Queensland, Cyclone Larry resulted in roughly AU$1.5 billion (US$1.1 billion) 2006 USD or AU$2 billion (US$1.55billion) 2022 USD in damage. At the time, this made Larry the costliest tropical cyclone to ever impact Australia; surpassing Cyclone Tracy in 1974 (not accounting for inflation). In 2011, Cyclone Yasi surpassed the damage total caused by Larry.

== Meteorological history ==
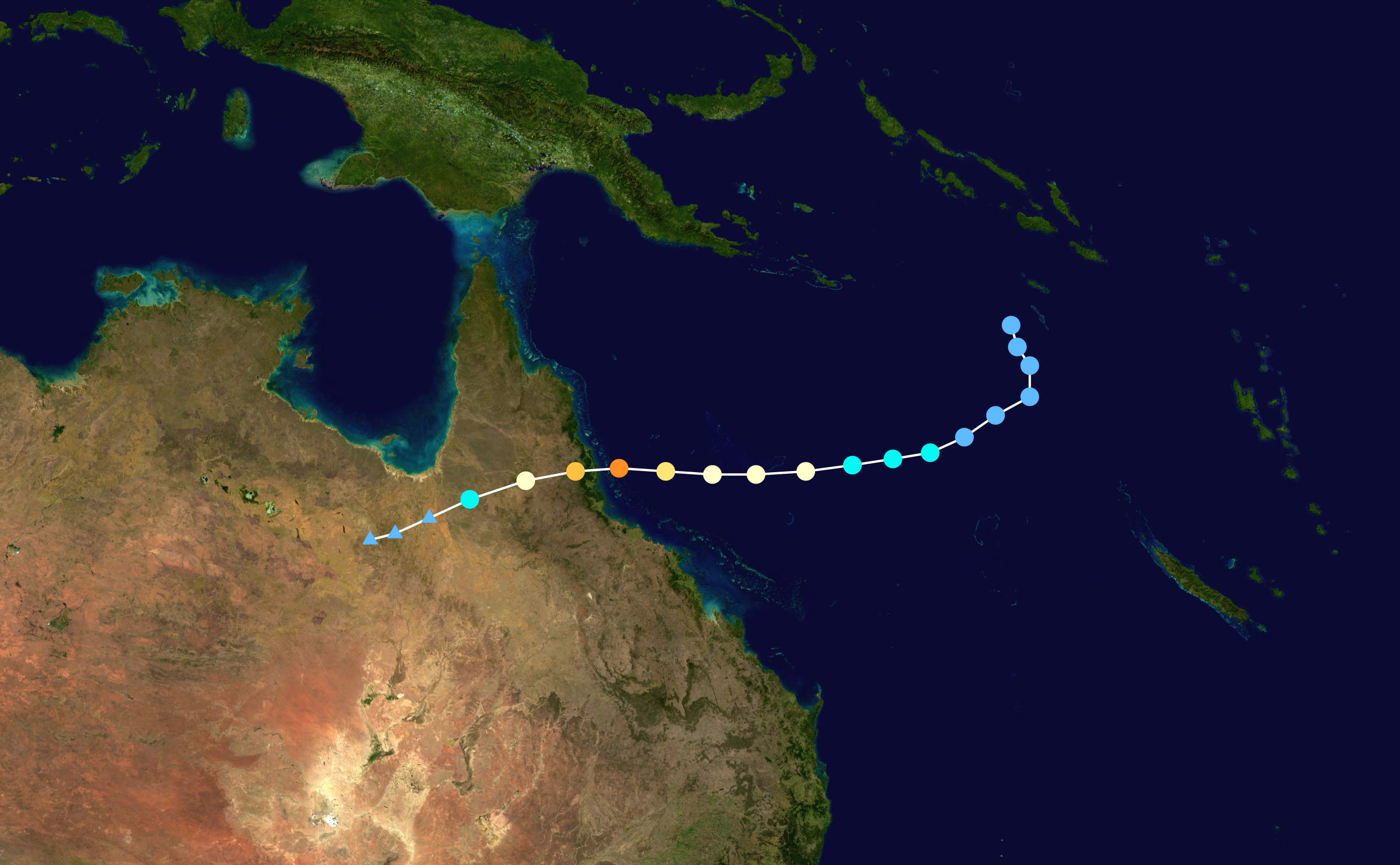
Map plotting the storm's track and intensity, according to the Saffir–Simpson scale Map key Saffir–Simpson scale Tropical depression (≤38 mph, ≤62 km/h) Tropical storm (39–73 mph, 63–118 km/h) Category 1 (74–95 mph, 119–153 km/h) Category 2 (96–110 mph, 154–177 km/h) Category 3 (111–129 mph, 178–208 km/h) Category 4 (130–156 mph, 209–251 km/h) Category 5 (≥157 mph, ≥252 km/h) Unknown Storm type Tropical cyclone Subtropical cyclone Extratropical cyclone, remnant low, tropical disturbance, or monsoon depression

Larry began as a low pressure system over the eastern Coral Sea that was monitored by the Australian Bureau of Meteorology from 16 March 2006. It formed into a tropical cyclone 1,150 kilometres (710 mi) off the coast of Queensland, Australia on Saturday 18 March 2006. Larry was a Category 2 cyclone in the Australian intensity scale when the cyclone watch commenced, and gradually intensified to a high Category 5 cyclone on that scale. The eye of Larry crossed the coast in between Gordonvale and Tully between 6:20 am and 7:20 am AEST on 20 March 2006. According to preliminary data, the winds may have reached 290 kilometres per hour (180 mph) with gusts to 310–320 kilometres per hour (190–200 mph). However, re-analysis based on land observations indicated that Cyclone Larry was a Category 4 cyclone during landfall, as wind gusts were estimated to have reached 240 kilometres per hour (150 mph) in the area of impact.

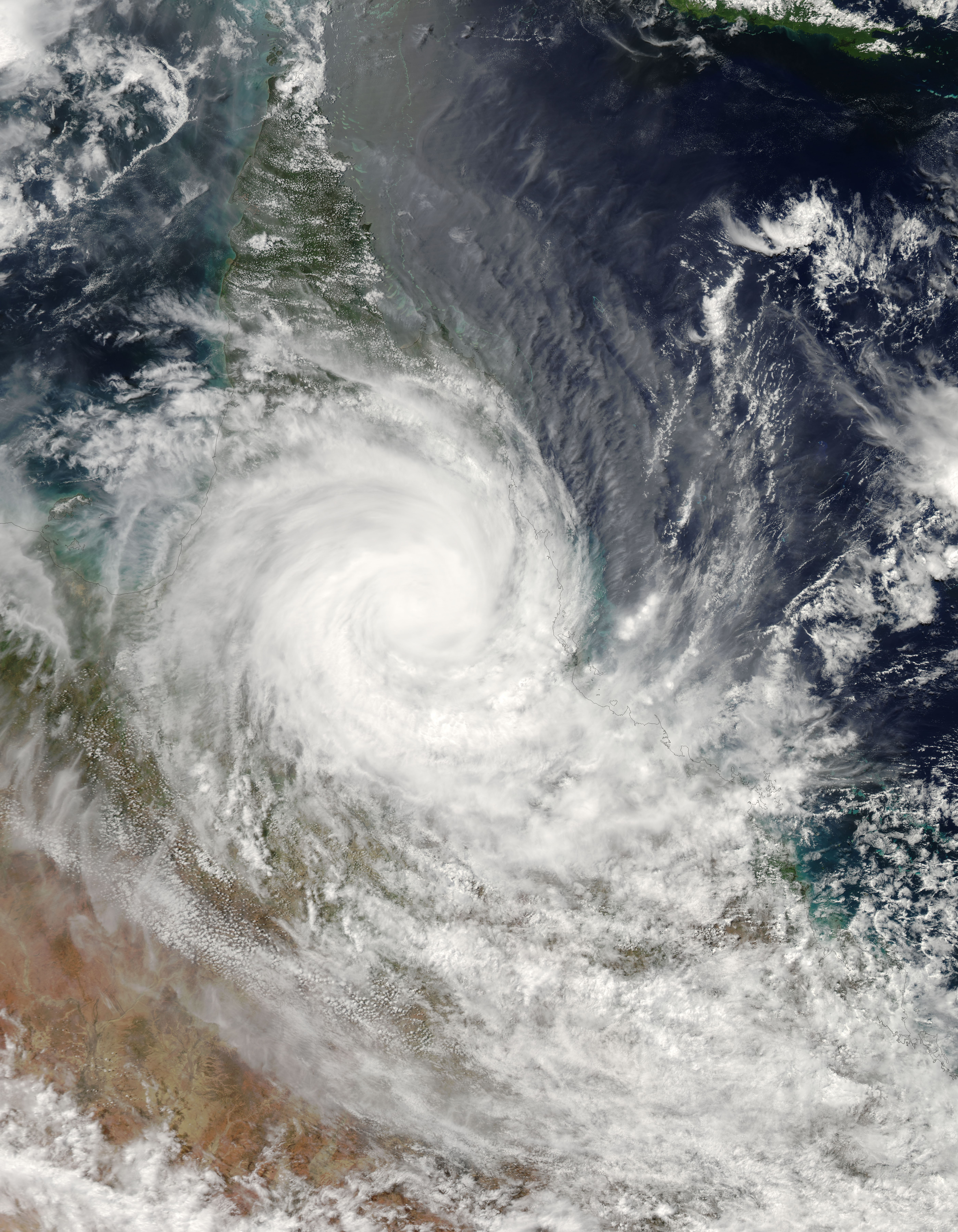
Larry making landfall on Queensland coast

The Australian intensity scale is based on maximum wind gusts, which are estimated to be 40 percent above 10-minute sustained winds. On this scale, Larry peaked as a Category 5 cyclone, during landfall. On the Saffir-Simpson Hurricane Scale, the Joint Typhoon Warning Center's maximum 1-minute wind speed assigned to the cyclone define it as a Category 4-equivalent storm.

Based on estimated winds speeds required to destroy simple structures, a damage survey of buildings in the Innisfail region estimated peak gust wind speeds (in reference to flat open country at a height of 10 metres (33 ft)) across the study area to range from 180 to 300 kilometres per hour (110 to 190 mph). This estimate correlates with the Bureau of Meteorology's re-analysis of Cyclone Larry at landfall. Their reviews of data suggest that Larry was a Category 5 system when it crossed the coast. It was confirmed by the Bureau of Meteorology in March 2007 that the cyclone made landfall as a Category 5 cyclone.

A 10-minute average wind speed of 108 knots (200 km/h; 124 mph) was reported in Innisfail during landfall, theoretically corresponding to 1-minute sustained winds of 125 knots (232 km/h; 144 mph), and maximum wind gusts generally consistent with a Saffir-Simpson scale Category 5 storm.

At 1 am Australian Eastern Standard Time on 21 March 2006, Larry was downgraded to a Tropical Low pressure system as it moved inland. Ex-tropical cyclone Larry was further tracked as it moved into western Queensland to the north of Mount Isa. Larry's short life as a cyclone is attributed to its speed; the system moved very quickly over the Coral Sea dissipating nearly 24 hours after landfall. Cyclone Larry was considered to be the worst cyclone to hit the coast of Queensland since 1931, until it was surpassed by Cyclone Yasi in 2011; consequently, the name "Larry" was retired on 12 December 2006.

== Impact ==
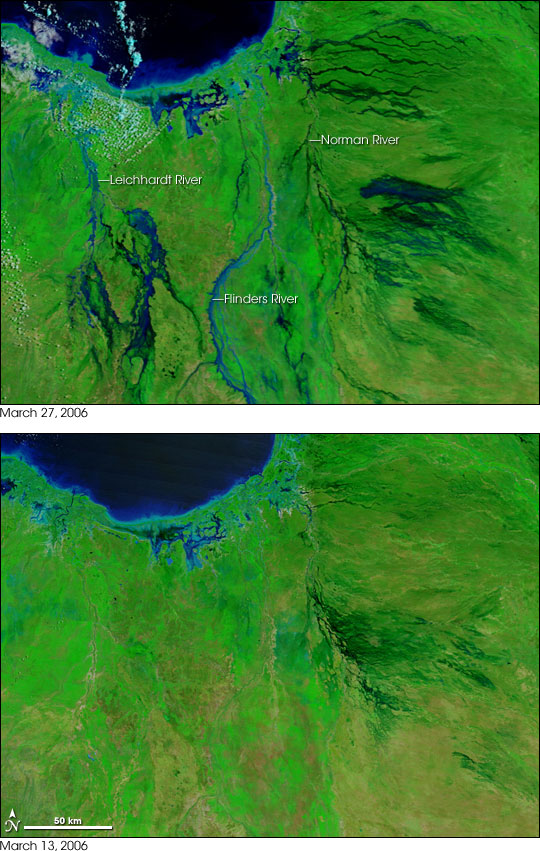
False-color image showing the extent of flooding in the area around Normanton and Karumba, Queensland. Green indicates vegetation and blue indicates water. The top image is two weeks after the bottom.

Cyclone Larry was regarded as the most powerful cyclone to affect Queensland in almost a century. According to Queensland state Counter Disaster Rescue Services executive director Frank Pagano, Cyclone Larry constituted "the most devastating cyclone that we could potentially see on the east coast of Queensland for decades ... there was great destruction." Then-Premier of Queensland, Peter Beattie declared Larry a disaster situation, comparing it to Cyclone Tracy, giving local governments the authority to enforce mandatory evacuations.

Then the Australian Prime Minister John Howard said of Larry, "this cyclone is of an enormous magnitude," and reserved several UH-60 Black Hawk and CH-47 Chinook heavy lift helicopters for rescue efforts in the aftermath of the cyclone. He also promised grants of $10,000 to businesses affected by the cyclone.

An appeal fund was launched by the Queensland Government, with an initial donation of $100,000; the Commonwealth Bank initially donated $50,000, and then increased its contribution to $1 Million after examining the devastation. Premier Beattie asked "everyone to dig deep and help people who have suffered in the devastation wreaked by the cyclone."

Cairns airport and harbour were closed, and all flights were suspended. Innisfail, where Larry made landfall, suffered severe damage. In Babinda, 30 kilometres (19 mi) north of Innisfail, up to 80% of buildings were damaged. The region's banana industry, which employs up to 6000 people, suffered extreme losses of crops, accounting for more than 80% of Australia's total banana crop. The Atherton Tablelands also received a great deal of damage from Cyclone Larry, with damage to buildings, and major disruptions to power, water and telephone services.

Other towns suffering damage included Silkwood (99% of homes damaged), Kurrimine Beach (30% of homes damaged), and Mission Beach (30% of homes damaged). Cairns, the largest city in the region affected by the cyclone, sustained minor structural damage, mostly comprising fallen power lines and houses damaged by fallen trees throughout the city. Light aircraft were flipped over at Cairns Airport.

A damage survey of buildings in the Innisfail region concluded that the majority of contemporary houses remained structurally intact, though many roller doors were destroyed. The report noted that the structures should have been able to withstand the cyclone, as the winds impacting the buildings were below the threshold required for meeting the region's building standards. Buildings constructed prior to the introduction of higher cyclone rating standards suffered comparatively more damage. In total 10,000 homes were damaged.

Preliminary reports estimated the cost of loss and damage to domestic and commercial premises is to be in excess of half a billion dollars.

After landfall, Tropical Cyclone Larry moved over north-western Queensland on 22–23 March 2006, with heavy rain across the region. Gereta Station, north of Mount Isa, recorded 583 mm of rain in the 48 hours to 9 am on 23 March 2006. Heavy flooding was reported along the Leichhardt River downstream, resulting in the inundation of some cattle properties.

One indirect fatality occurred when the storm caused a traffic accident near where it made landfall.

== Aftermath ==
Costliest Australian region tropical cyclones
Rank	Tropical cyclones	Season	Damage
1	4 Yasi	2010–11	$3.6 billion
2	4 Debbie	2016–17	$2.73 billion
3	TS Oswald	2012–13	$2.52 billion
4	4 Alfred	2024–25	$1.36 billion
5	4 Veronica	2018–19	$1.2 billion
6	5 Ita	2013–14	$1.15 billion
7	4 Larry	2005–06	$1.1 billion
8	4 Zelia	2024–25	$733 million
9	4 Jasper	2023–24	$670 million
10	3 Tracy	1974–75	$645 million

Cyclone Larry caused extensive and persistent damage to the regions natural rainforest. Normally resilient to high wind speeds of previous cyclones the force of Larry stripped several hundred thousand acres of leaves. A large quantity of major ND upper canopy trees were blown down or broken off. many stripped and damaged trees unable to resist a variety of tropical pests caused a second wave of dying to occur in the following months. The regions forest, famous as being similar paleoforest to the Amazon, became lower in overall height.

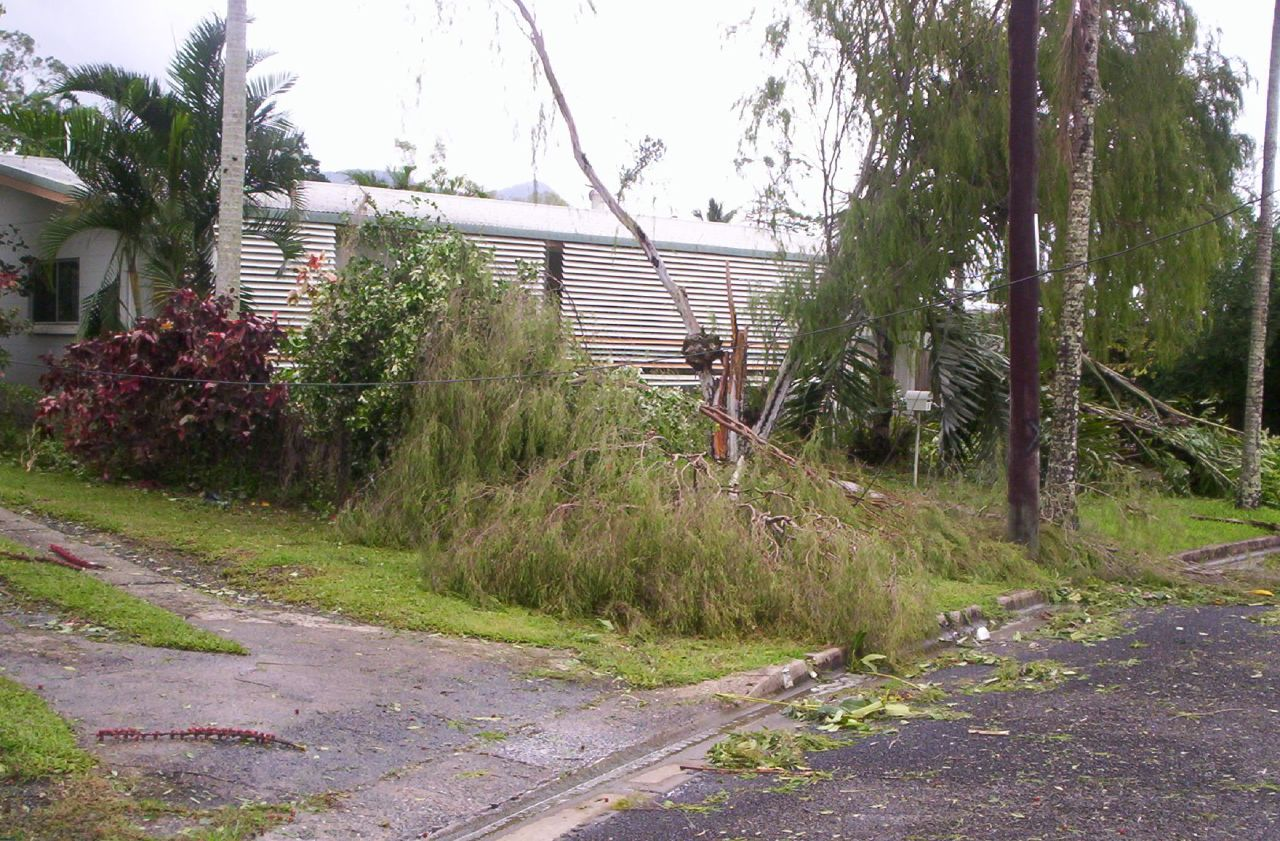
Photo taken by a resident in Edmonton, an outer suburb of Cairns in the aftermath of the storm, on 20 March 2006.

On 27 March, the Governor General of Australia, Michael Jeffery, visited the area several days into the recovery. He viewed the devastation from the air and also met with groups of people on the ground.

=== Australian Defence Force ===
A few hours after the immediate effects of the cyclone, the Australian Defence Force dispatched elements of the Townsville based 3rd Brigade and the Cairns-based 51st Battalion, Far North Queensland Regiment, Royal Australian Navy and the Royal Australian Air Force including: six Black Hawk helicopters, three Iroquois helicopters, one Chinook helicopter, one Seahawk helicopter, three Navy Balikpapan-class landing craft, two Caribou aircraft, two C-130 Hercules, and several LARC-V amphibious 4WD vehicles.

A Combat Services Support Battalion coordinated emergency support at Innisfail Showgrounds, providing health care, environmental advice, fresh food and purified water (as well as testing local supplies), tarpaulins, bath and shower facilities, and up to 500 beds.

The Cowley Beach Training Area near Mourilyan Harbour, 25 kilometres (16 mi) south of Innisfail, was significantly affected by the cyclone, and its use as a base by recovery teams was therefore limited.

=== QLD Rural Fire Service (Thuringowa Group) ===
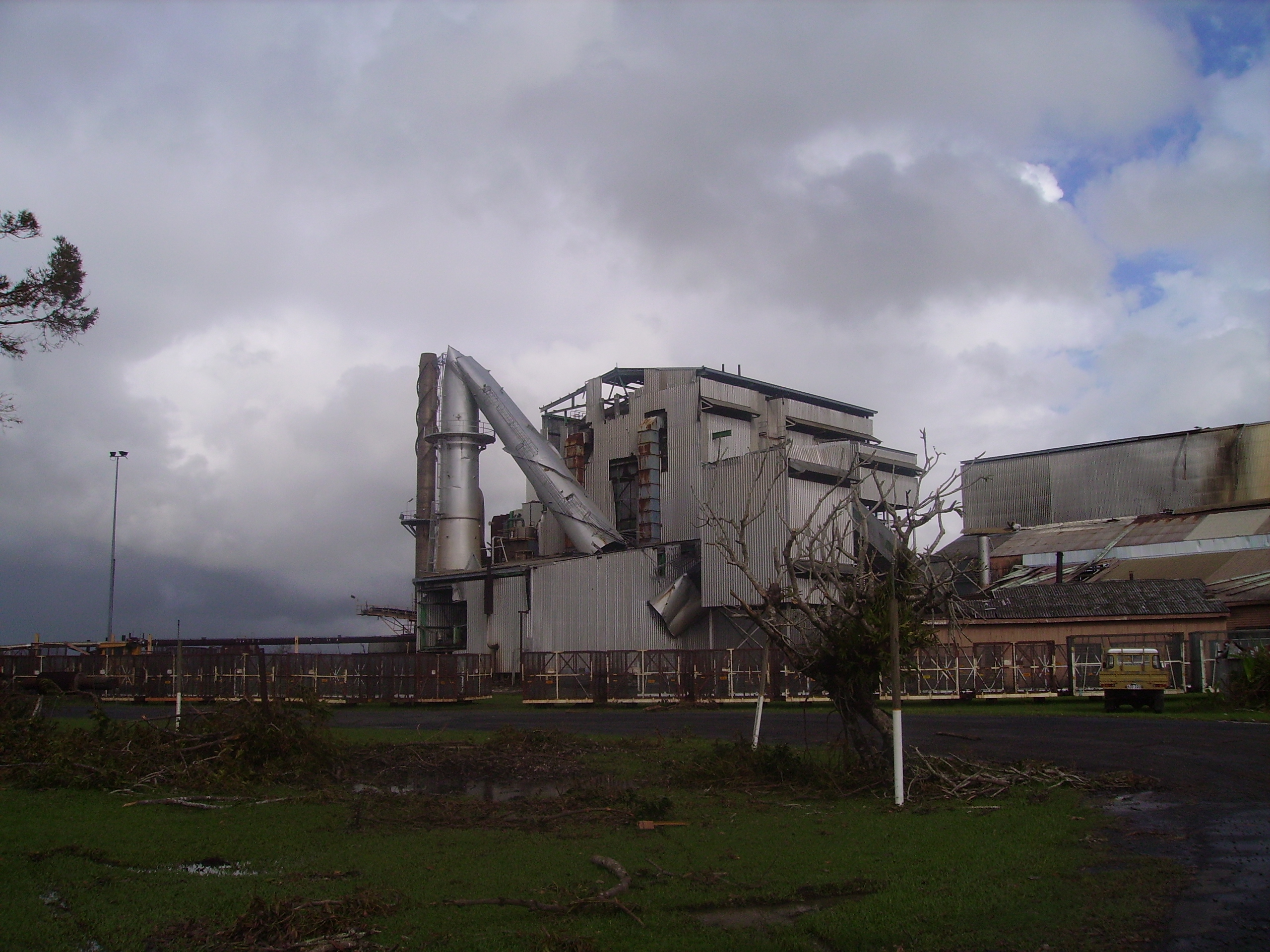
The Mourilyan sugar mill after the cyclone

Thuringowa Group Rural Fire Brigade volunteers responded immediately after the impact of the cyclone. The rural fire volunteer task force set up a command post at East Palmerston, which was in place for a number of weeks. A newly acquired Emergency Support Unit was quickly prepared for disaster relief operations. This unit had to be sold before STC Yasi slammed the North QLD Coastline however, the Rural Fire Service and QLD Fire & Rescue had honed their incident management skills and along with the LDMG in Townsville, ensured that emergency response during and after the cyclone were suitable and appropriate.

=== Leadership by General Peter Cosgrove ===
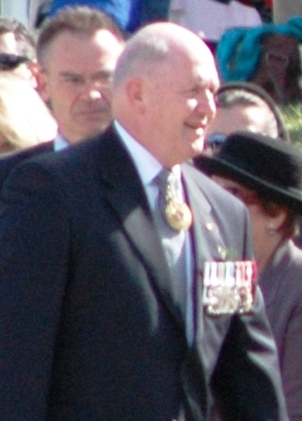
General Peter Cosgrove, head of the Cyclone Larry Taskforce, pictured in 2008 at Canberra.

Former Chief of the Defence Force, General Peter Cosgrove, took charge of recovery efforts, and was directing activities from Innisfail by 24 March 2006. He called for an economic assessment by state and federal governments, and specified a moratorium on businesses' debt repayments to banks for 3 months.

=== Tradesmen and prisoners ===
About 150 tradesmen from around Australia arrived in Innisfail around 26 March 2006, and worked to reopen schools and other public buildings, and to make private dwellings habitable.

The Queensland Government also investigated how many trusted prisoners could be organised for work-gangs.

=== Accommodation ===
Media outlets reported that rental agents were working to find accommodation for displaced persons, after the already tight accommodation market was exacerbated by the severe damage done to homes in the affected areas. Many tenants and owners of severely damaged homes had little chance of finding accommodation in the area, and many were expected to move to Cairns for several months. Many people were sheltered in town halls while the defence force built additional temporary accommodation.

=== Banana Shortage ===
The cyclone destroyed 80–90% of Australia's banana crop. Australia is relatively free of banana pests and diseases, and therefore does not allow bananas to be imported. Bananas were in short supply throughout Australia for the remainder of 2006, which increased prices across the country by 400–500%. The average price of bananas was $15 per kilo.

== See also ==
- Other tropical cyclones of the same name
- List of Queensland tropical cyclones

- Cyclone Yasi – Costliest tropical cyclone recorded in the Australian region basin
- Cyclone Marcia
- Cyclone Debbie
- Cyclone Ita
