= Cyclone Jasper =

Category 5 Australian region and South Pacific cyclone in 2023

Severe Tropical Cyclone Jasper
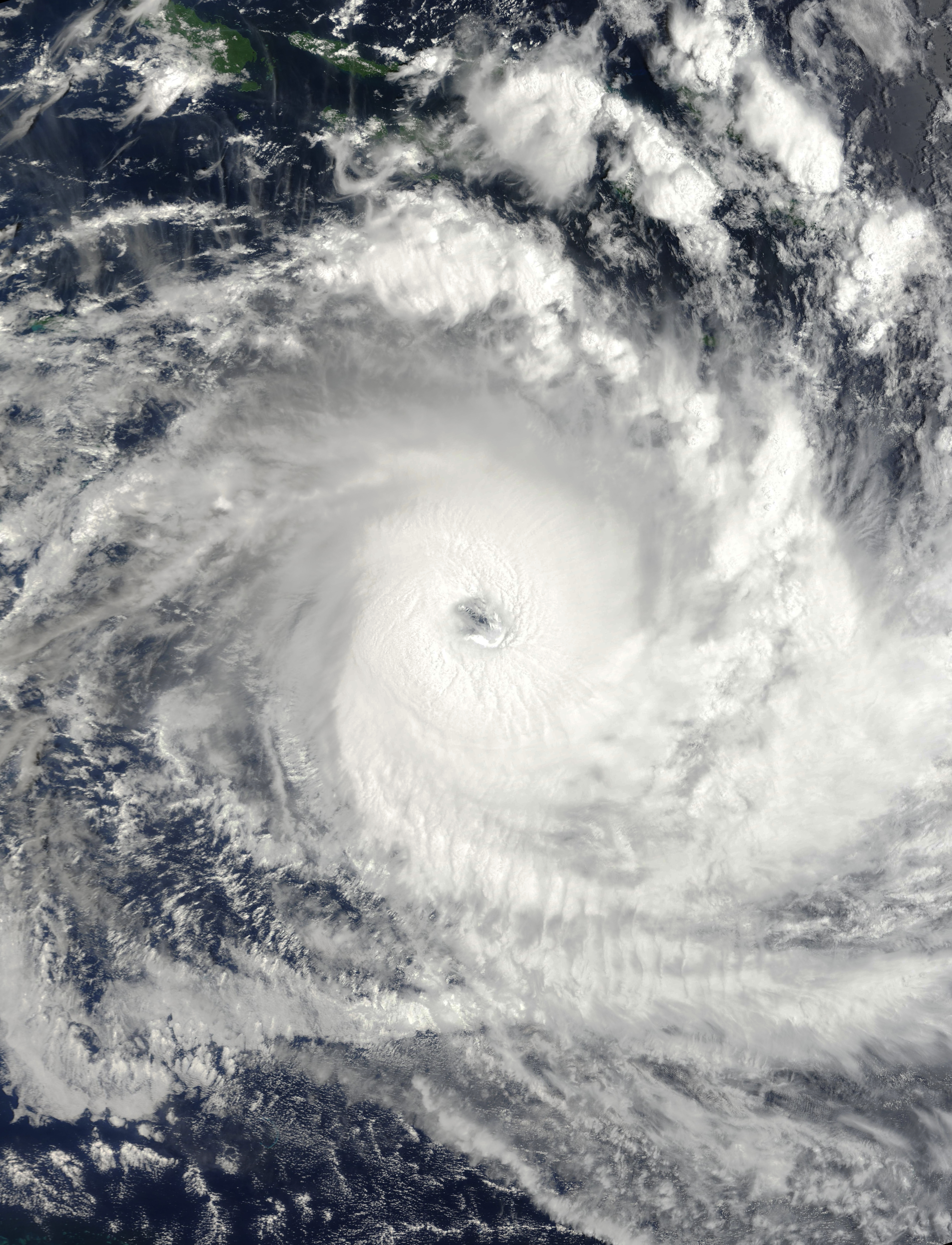
- Cyclone Jasper at peak intensity on 8 December

Meteorological history
- Formed: 2 December 2023
- Dissipated: 18 December 2023

Category 5 severe tropical cyclone
- 10-minute sustained (BOM)
- Highest winds: 215 km/h (130 mph)
- Lowest pressure: 926 hPa (mbar); 27.34 inHg

Category 4-equivalent tropical cyclone
- 1-minute sustained (SSHWS/JTWC)
- Highest winds: 220 km/h (140 mph)
- Lowest pressure: 937 hPa (mbar); 27.67 inHg

Overall effects
- Fatalities: 1 total
- Missing: 1 total
- Damage: $670 million (2023 USD)
- Areas affected: Solomon Islands, Far North Queensland
- IBTrACS
- Part of the 2023–24 South Pacific and Australian region seasons

Severe Tropical Cyclone Jasper was the wettest tropical cyclone in Australian history, surpassing Peter of 1979. The third disturbance of the 2023–24 South Pacific cyclone season and the first named storm and severe tropical cyclone of the 2023–24 Australian region cyclone season, Jasper was first noted as an area of low pressure located in the South Pacific Ocean, which was initially slow to develop as it tracked southwestwards through the South Pacific Ocean in Fiji's area of responsibility. The system began to consolidate as it moved towards the Australian region, with the Australian Bureau of Meteorology (BoM) upgrading the system to a Category 1 tropical cyclone on the Australian scale and naming it Jasper. The storm quickly intensified and became a Category 5 tropical cyclone on 7 December; the Joint Typhoon Warning Center (JTWC) estimated sustained winds of 220 km/h (140 mph). Jasper soon entered an environment of increasing wind shear, causing the system to steadily weaken. Its low-level circulation centre became totally exposed and it maintained a poorly defined convective structure as it approached northern Queensland. Jasper later reintensified, and on 13 December, made landfall as a Category 2 tropical cyclone off the eastern coast of the Cape York Peninsula near Wujal Wujal. Jasper then weakened into an ex-tropical low and remained traceable overland as it moved southeast, and was last noted on 18 December.

Throughout Jasper's existence, moderate to locally intense rainfall accompanied the system; the storm dropped very heavy rainfall, peaking at 2,252 mm (88.7 in) at Bairds near the Daintree River. Many locals used personal watercraft to extract people who were trapped on their roofs within the coastal suburbs. Some flights were cancelled at Cairns Airport. One man died and another went missing due to flooding caused by Jasper. The Insurance Council of Australia estimated that Jasper was responsible for at least AU$1 billion (US$670 million) in damages.

== Meteorological history ==
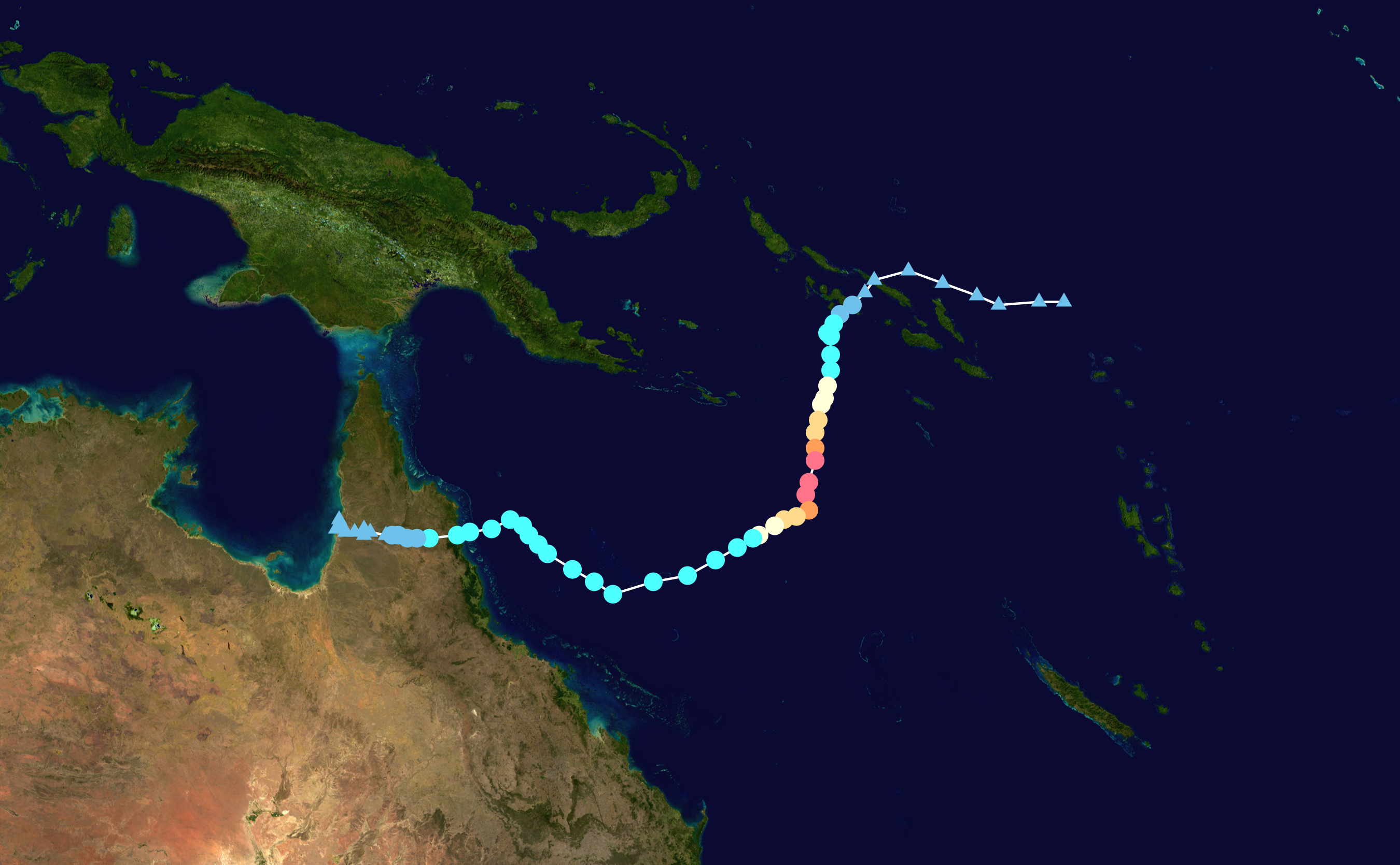
Map plotting the storm's track and intensity, according to the Saffir–Simpson scale Map key Saffir–Simpson scale Tropical depression (≤38 mph, ≤62 km/h) Tropical storm (39–73 mph, 63–118 km/h) Category 1 (74–95 mph, 119–153 km/h) Category 2 (96–110 mph, 154–177 km/h) Category 3 (111–129 mph, 178–208 km/h) Category 4 (130–156 mph, 209–251 km/h) Category 5 (≥157 mph, ≥252 km/h) Unknown Storm type Tropical cyclone Subtropical cyclone Extratropical cyclone, remnant low, tropical disturbance, or monsoon depression

On 2 December, the Australian Bureau of Meteorology (BoM) and the Fiji Meteorological Service (FMS) began to monitor Tropical Disturbance 03F—which was re-designated as Tropical Low 02U—in the South Pacific Ocean in Fiji's area of responsibility. At this stage, the system was located within a favourable environment for further development with radial outflow in the upper troposphere, low vertical wind shear, and warm (30–31 °C) sea surface temperatures. During 4 December, the system subsequently crossed 160°E, where it exited the South Pacific basin and entered the Australian region—which prompted the FMS to pass the primary warning responsibility to the BoM. The low was in a favourable environment, evident by excellent radial outflow, deep convective banding and very low shear, resulting the United States Joint Typhoon Warning Center (JTWC) issued a Tropical Cyclone Formation Alert (TCFA) later that day, projecting a high likelihood of a significant tropical cyclone developing.

Later the next day, the JTWC subsequently initiated advisories on the system and classified it as Tropical Cyclone 03P. The BoM followed suit at 06:00 UTC on 5 December—officially upgrading the system to a Category 1 tropical cyclone on the Australian scale and assigning the name Jasper. The cyclone started to track southward under the steering influence of a near equatorial ridge to the east. During the next day, the cyclone core's center continued to organise, with deep convective bands starting to wrap around the center, prompting the JTWC to upgrade the system to a Category 1 hurricane on the Saffir–Simpson hurricane wind scale (SSHWS). Jasper rapidly intensified into a Category 3 severe tropical cyclone, fuelled by warm sea surface temperatures and low wind shear. Convective banding blossomed around the storm, and a formative eye appeared on satellite imagery. Late on the next day, the BoM reported that Jasper had peaked in intensity around 06:00 UTC as a high-end Category 5 severe tropical cyclone, with estimated maximum 10-minute sustained winds of 215 km/h (130 mph), and a central barometric pressure of 926 hPa (27.34 inHg). Around the time, the JTWC stated that Jasper peaked with one-minute sustained winds of 220 km/h (140 mph)—equivalent to a Category 4 hurricane. Operationally, the BoM classified Jasper as a high-end Category 4 severe tropical cyclone with winds of 195 km/h (120 mph), but during post-cyclone reanalysis concluded a peak wind speed of 215 km/h (130 mph) based on Synthetic-aperture radar measurements.

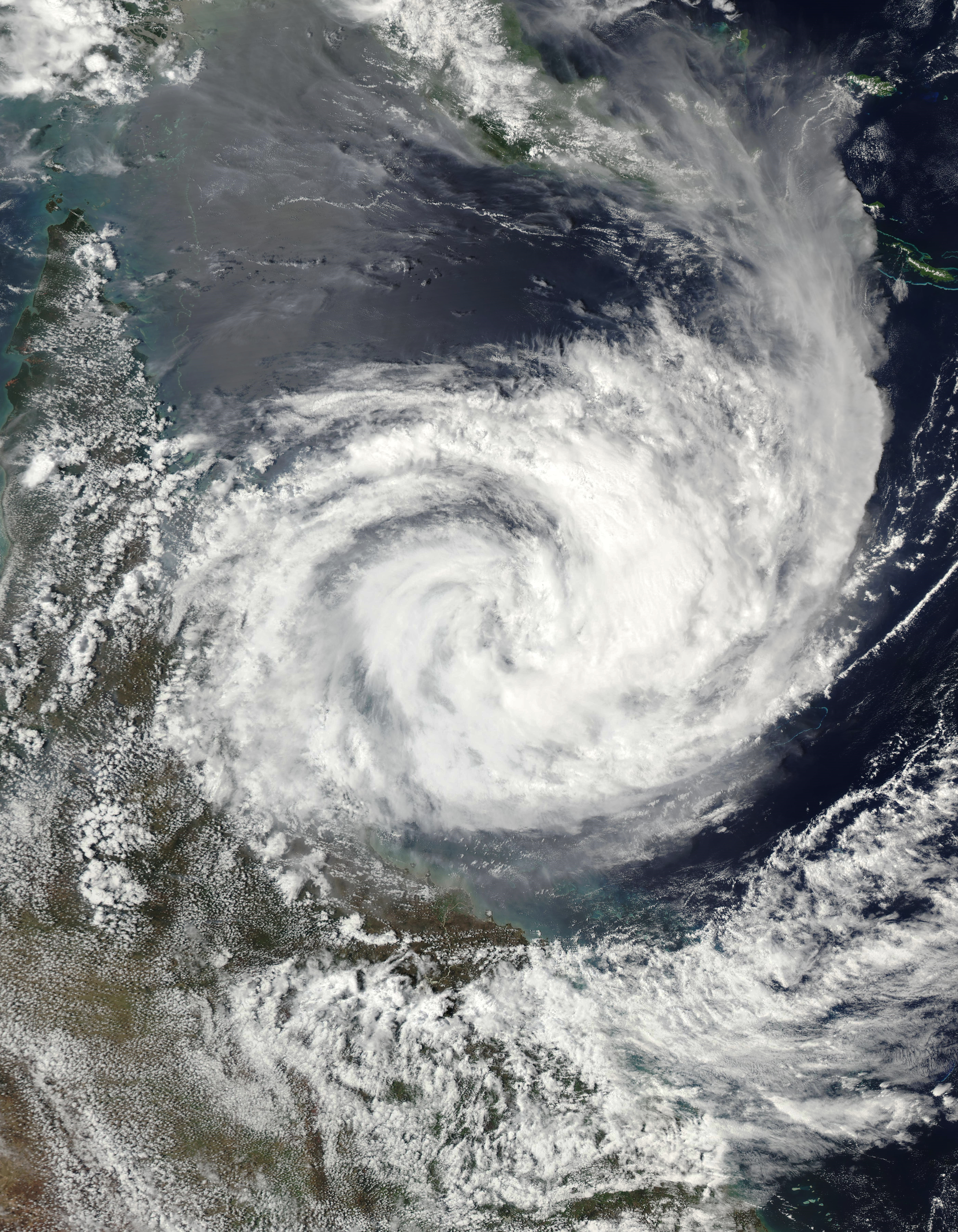
Cyclone Jasper approaching Queensland on 12 December.

Shortly thereafter, Jasper began weakening, with its eye becoming cloud-filled and the deep convection eroding due to dry air entrainment. Jasper managed to maintain its intensity while battling unfavorable conditions, but soon significantly weakened due to strong (20–25 km/h (12–16 mph) vertical wind shear. Early on 9 December, increasing wind shear severely disrupted the convection, with deep convection persisting along the southern periphery and weakening the cyclone back to tropical storm status. The system's low-level circulation center became totally exposed, with strong wind shear eroding the entire system. Jasper turned westward on the morning of 11 December and accelerated toward the Queensland coast as deep convection re-developed near the center. Despite that, Jasper retained a poorly defined convective structure to its southwest which was wrapped into the convective banding. An eye-like feature developed in the center of the storm on 13 December, indicative of an intensifying storm. The storm maintained a banding eye, surrounded by a symmetric ring of cold, −67–149 °F (−55–65 °C) cloud tops around the eyewall. Jasper further strengthened before making landfall off the eastern coast of the Cape York Peninsula near Wujal Wujal at 12:00 UTC with sustained winds of 95 km/h (60 mph). The JTWC discontinued warnings on the system later that day. By 14:00 UTC that day, the BoM reported that Jasper had weakened to a tropical low. However, Jasper remained traceable, and the BoM would give the tropical low a moderate chance of redeveloping into a tropical cyclone on 15 December. However, they would soon downgrade its chances of re-developing into a very low as the storm turned southeast further inland, causing the tropical low to rapidly weaken, and on 18 December, Jasper was last noted over the Cape York Peninsula.

== Preparations ==
Wettest tropical cyclones and their remnants in Australia Highest-known totals
Precipitation			Storm	Location	Ref.
Rank	mm	in	Storm	Location	Ref.
1	2,252	88.66	Jasper 2023	Bairds	
2	1,947	76.65	Peter 1979	Mount Bellenden Ker	
3	1,870	73.62	Rona 1999	Mount Bellenden Ker	
4	1,318	51.89	Wanda 1974	Mount Glorious	
5	1,256.8	49.48	Fletcher 2014	Kowanyama	
6	1,111	43.74	Alfred 2025	Upper Springbrook	
7	1,082	42.60	Aivu 1989	Dalrymple Heights	
8	1,065	41.93	May 1998	Burketown	
9	1,000	39.37	Justin 1997	Willis Island	
10	1,000	39.37	Ellie 2009		

During 6 December, warnings were issued by the Solomon Islands Meteorological Service for parts of Rennell and Bellona Province in the Solomon Islands, after it became apparent that Jasper was moving towards the southernmost islands of New Georgia. They warned that the system was expected to produce gale-force winds, rough seas, moderate to heavy swells of 2.5–4.5 metres (8.2–14.8 ft) and coastal flooding over the islands. Ships across the country were to be suspended. Operations at Solomon Airlines were suspended throughout 5 December. In anticipation of the possibility of Jasper making landfall on the Queensland coast at tropical cyclone intensity, the Australian Bureau of Meteorology (BoM) issued a number of official warnings to the public in advance of the system's arrival. Upon weakening to Category 1 strength at 12:00 UTC on 11 December, several storm warnings and a cyclone watch were issued for coastal and inland areas between Cooktown and Townsville.

In preparation for Jasper, the Queensland Police Service sent several officers to assist local councils in the warning zone. Cairns Airport postponed all flights scheduled for 13 December. Evacuation centers were also set up in Cairns, Port Douglas, and Cooktown in preparation for the storm. Services Australia temporarily closed some of its Medicare and Centrelink offices in Far North Queensland. Bureau of Meteorology staff on Willis Island, about 450 kilometres (280 mi) from the coast, were evacuated by the Royal Australian Navy (RAN) ahead of the storm's arrival. Businesses in Cairns were sandbagged, while local charities offered shelter to homeless residents. Michael Kerr, mayor of the Shire of Douglas, urged tourists in the region to have a plan to shelter during the cyclone.

== Impact ==
Costliest Australian region tropical cyclones
Rank	Tropical cyclones	Season	Damage
1	4 Yasi	2010–11	$3.6 billion
2	4 Debbie	2016–17	$2.73 billion
3	TS Oswald	2012–13	$2.52 billion
4	4 Alfred	2024–25	$1.36 billion
5	4 Veronica	2018–19	$1.2 billion
6	5 Ita	2013–14	$1.15 billion
7	4 Larry	2005–06	$1.1 billion
8	4 Zelia	2024–25	$733 million
9	4 Jasper	2023–24	$670 million
10	3 Tracy	1974–75	$645 million

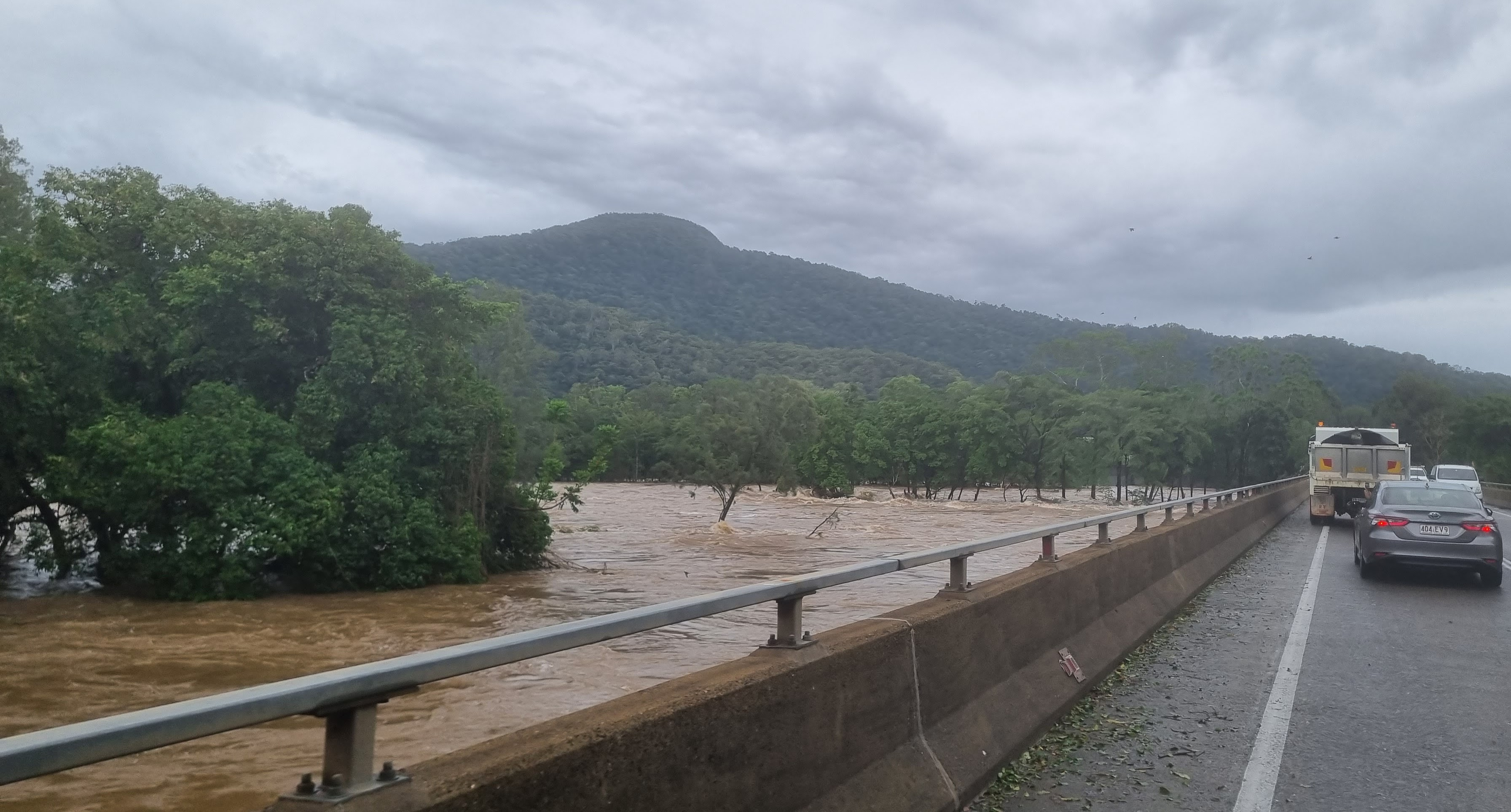
Flooding at the Barron River Bridge in Kamerunga on 18 December

In Far North Queensland, Jasper caused thousands of properties to lose power. Authorities rescued twelve people and a dog in Mossman who were stranded due to flooding. Officials sent authorities to monitor areas affected by Jasper after looters raided homes and businesses. The Queensland State Emergency Service (QSES) received 846 calls for help within Far North Queensland due to Jasper. Numerous roads remained closed after the storm passed, including the Captain Cook Highway between Cairns and Port Douglas. Jasper produced torrential rain throughout Northern Queensland, with five-day totals of 2,166 mm (85.3 in) reported at Black Mountain and 2,025 mm (79.7 in) at Myola, both near the town of Kuranda, making Jasper the wettest tropical cyclone in Australia. 24-hour totals include the Daintree catchment recording 624 mm (24.6 in) of rain, while the town of Diwan recorded exactly 500 mm (20 in).

Cyclone Jasper also brought brief heavy rainfall accumulations in the Bloomfield River, averaging from 625–796 mm (24.6–31.3 in) with rainfall pushing 803 mm (31.6 in) in Wujal Wujal and Daintree Village. The Barron River surpassed the March 1977 record of 3.8 metres (12 ft), making the event the worst flooding event since records began in 1915. The water spilling over Copperlode Dam reached 2.69 metres (8.8 ft) at peak, the second highest on record. This caused its catchment creek, Freshwater Creek, to break its banks, threatening the suburbs of Redlynch, Brinsmead and lower Freshwater. The flooding was historic, breaking all records according to the BoM. The BoM announced that 21 stations had received over 1,000 mm (39 in) since Jasper made landfall. A man was found dead in a flooded home in Far North Queensland due to flooding caused by the cyclone. An 85-year-old male went missing due to the flooding in the town of Degarra. Later damage assessments stated that 18 homes were destroyed, with another 168 severely damaged by the storm.

== Aftermath ==
The QSES responded to over 1,000 calls for help by people within the Cairns region. Queensland Fire and Emergency Services swift water rescue crews and QSES were also tasked with numerous requests for evacuations, within the coastal suburbs. Many locals used personal watercraft to extract people who were trapped on their rooves within the coastal suburbs. Cairns Airport also halted all operations, due to the low visibility and the extreme flooding occurring on the landing strip of the airport.

Insurance Council of Australia estimated that Jasper was responsible for AU$1 billion (US$670 million). The Albanese government provided funding to residents who had been directly impacted by the event. A total of more than AU$15 million (US$10 million) was distributed to residents. The National Australia Bank announced that AU$1 million (US$670,000) would be relief measures for customers that had been affected by the storm. In January 2024, the Federal and Queensland governments jointly contributed AU$5 million (US$3.35 million) as a tourism recovery plan aimed at attracting travellers back to Far North Queensland.

== See also ==
- Tropical cyclones in 2023
- Weather of 2023
- List of Queensland tropical cyclones

- Cyclone Peter (1978) – a severe tropical cyclone which became the wettest tropical cyclone to impact Australia
- Cyclone Katrina (1998) – an erratic severe tropical cyclone which also significantly weakened before reaching northern Queensland
- Cyclone Tasha (2010) – a weak tropical cyclone which contributed to the 2010–2011 Queensland floods
- Cyclone Yasi (2011) – a powerful and destructive severe tropical cyclone which also originated from the South Pacific Ocean before impacting Queensland
