= Cyclones Rona and Frank =

Australian region and South Pacific cyclone in 1999

Severe Tropical Cyclone Rona Severe Tropical Cyclone Frank
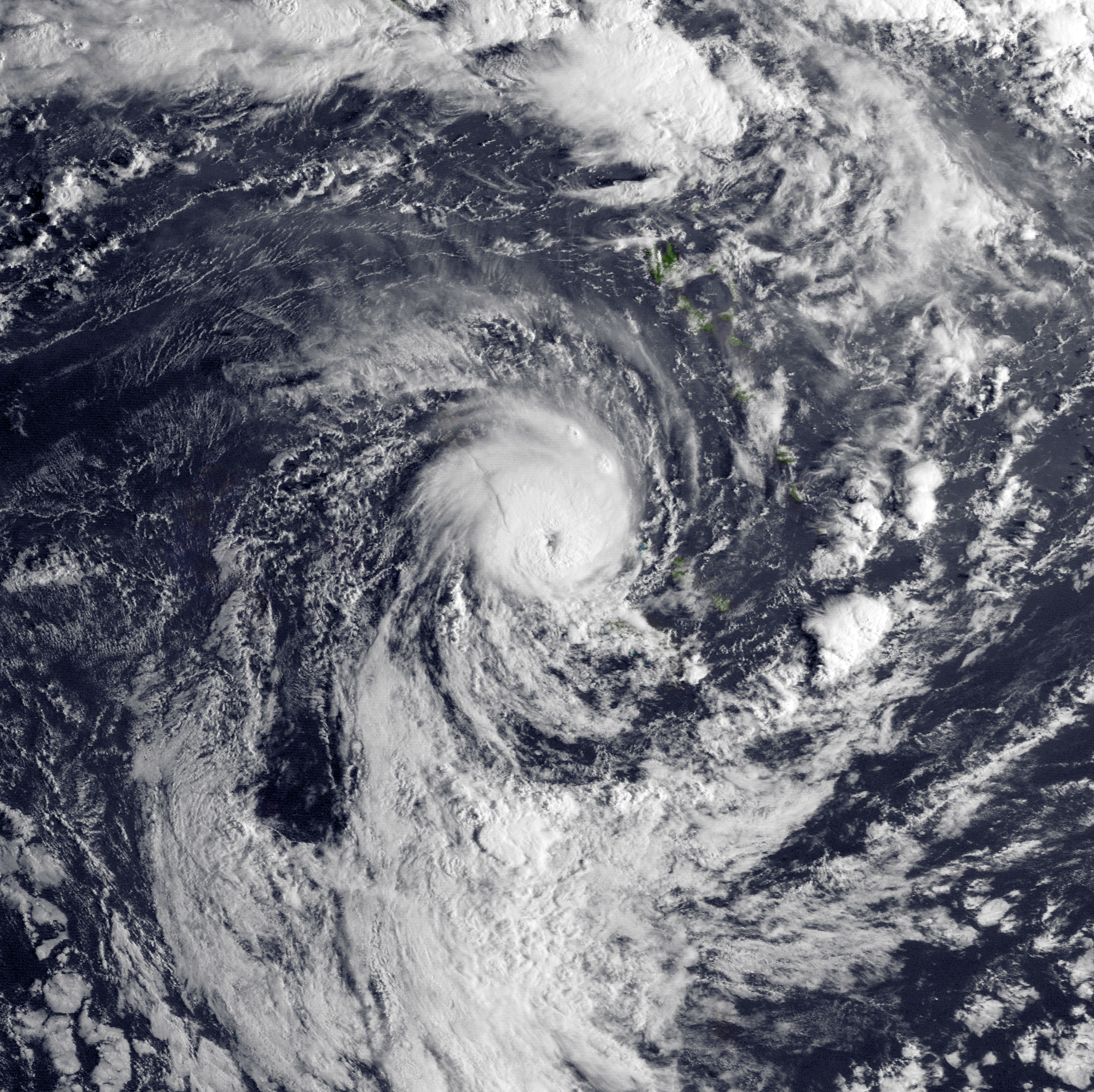
- Cyclone Frank at peak intensity nearing landfall on New Caledonia on 19 February

Meteorological history
- as Severe Tropical Cyclone Rona
- Formed: 9 February 1999
- Dissipated: 12 February 1999

Category 3 severe tropical cyclone
- 10-minute sustained (Aus)
- Highest winds: 140 km/h (85 mph)
- Lowest pressure: 970 hPa (mbar); 28.64 inHg

Tropical storm
- 1-minute sustained (SSHWS/JTWC)
- Highest winds: 110 km/h (70 mph)
- Lowest pressure: 980 hPa (mbar); 28.94 inHg

Meteorological history
- as Severe Tropical Cyclone Frank
- Formed: February 16, 1999
- Extratropical: February 21, 1999
- Dissipated: February 27, 1999

Category 3 severe tropical cyclone
- 10-minute sustained (FMS)
- Highest winds: 150 km/h (90 mph)
- Lowest pressure: 955 hPa (mbar); 28.20 inHg

Category 2-equivalent tropical cyclone
- 1-minute sustained (SSHWS/JTWC)
- Highest winds: 175 km/h (110 mph)
- Lowest pressure: 944 hPa (mbar); 27.88 inHg

Overall effects
- Fatalities: 7
- Damage: $150 million (1999 USD)
- Areas affected: Eastern Australia and New Caledonia
- Part of the 1998–99 Australian region and the South Pacific cyclone seasons

Severe Tropical Cyclone Rona (JTWC designation: 20P) and Severe Tropical Cyclone Frank (JTWC designation: 22P; RSMC Nadi designation: 16F) were a pair of tropical cyclones that affected Queensland and New Caledonia during the 1998–99 Australian region cyclone season and the 1998–99 South Pacific cyclone season. Rona originated from a low that developed on 9 February about 225 km (140 mi) to the northeast of Cairns. Over the next couple of days, the low slowly developed further before it was upgraded into a Category 1 cyclone on the Australian intensity scale by the Australian Bureau of Meteorology on 10 February as it started to move towards the southwest. Subsequently, Rona rapidly intensified just before making landfall near the Cape York Peninsula. While the low-level circulation became difficult to locate on 12 February, the upper-level circulation eventually emerged into the Coral Sea and later regenerated into Tropical Cyclone Frank. The system rapidly intensified before making landfall on New Caledonia as a Category 2 cyclone on the Saffir-Simpson Hurricane Scale in the early morning hours of 20 February. Frank was re-classified as an extratropical cyclone the next day.

Seven deaths were reported from Rona and a state of disaster was declared. Over 2,000 fled their homes due to flooding and many residents were caught off-guard for the storm. Significant crop damage was reported. Overall, Rona brought $150 million (1999 USD) in damage to Queensland. Minor damage was reported in New Caledonia. After the season, the name "Rona" was retired from the list of tropical cyclone names.

== Meteorological history ==
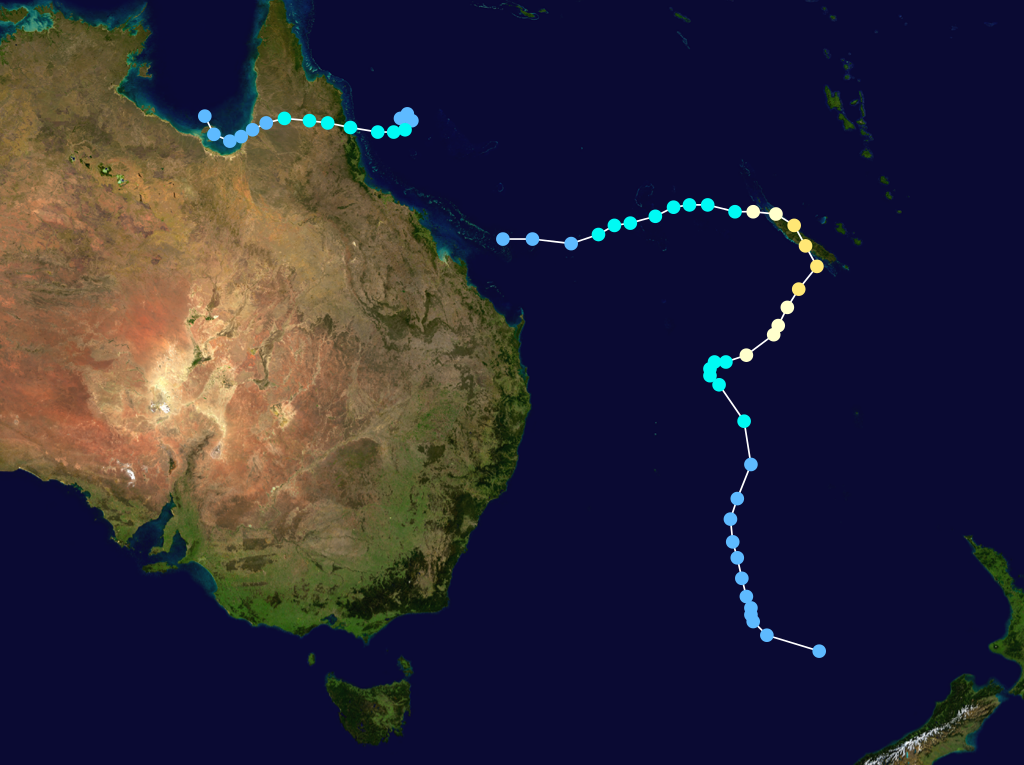
Map plotting the storm's track and intensity, according to the Saffir–Simpson scale Map key Saffir–Simpson scale Tropical depression (≤38 mph, ≤62 km/h) Tropical storm (39–73 mph, 63–118 km/h) Category 1 (74–95 mph, 119–153 km/h) Category 2 (96–110 mph, 154–177 km/h) Category 3 (111–129 mph, 178–208 km/h) Category 4 (130–156 mph, 209–251 km/h) Category 5 (≥157 mph, ≥252 km/h) Unknown Storm type Tropical cyclone Subtropical cyclone Extratropical cyclone, remnant low, tropical disturbance, or monsoon depression

On 9 February 1999, the Australian Bureau of Meteorology (BoM) started to monitor a tropical low, that had developed within the monsoon trough about 225 km (140 mi) to the northeast of Cairns, in Queensland, Australia. At this time strong westerly winds persisted around the northern side of the low, however, a weak pressure gradient and light winds existed to the south of the system and the monsoon trough. This was because of a deep area of low pressure near south-eastern Queensland, had an intense pressure gradient to its south, which prevented the trade winds extending up to the monsoon trough. Throughout 9 February the tropical low moved eastwards under the influence of a middle-to upper-level trough over eastern Australia, however, over the next day the trough dissipated along with the deep area of low pressure. As a result, an area of strong ridging developed to the south of the system, while the trade winds rapidly extended northwards to the monsoon trough. The upper level pattern also became favorable for further development, with an outflow channel forming on the equator-ward side of the system. The low subsequently rapidly intensified during 10 February, with atmospheric convection surrounding the system dramatically improving. The system was subsequently named Rona by the BoM later that day, after it had developed into a category one tropical cyclone on the Australian tropical cyclone intensity scale. At around the same time the United States Joint Typhoon Warning Center (JTWC) initiated advisories and designated the system as Tropical Cyclone 20P, after it had become equivalent to a tropical storm. As it was named the system was located about 310 km (195 mi) to the east of the northern Queensland coast, and had started to move towards the southwest under the influence of the subtropical ridge of high pressure.

After the system had been named the system continued to intensify, and became a category 3 severe tropical cyclone on the Australian scale early on 11 February. The system subsequently moved rapidly west-northwest towards the Queensland coast as the ridge strengthened. Just before Rona made landfall the JTWC estimated that the system had peak 10-minute sustained wind speeds of 120 km/h (75 mph), this made it equivalent to a category 1 hurricane on the Saffir–Simpson hurricane wind scale. However, during their post system analysis they lowered their estimate, to between 100–110 km/h (60–70 mph) which made it equivalent to a tropical storm. The BoM subsequently estimated that the system had peak 10-minute sustained wind speeds of 130 km/h (80 mph) when it made landfall on the Queensland coast, at around 1300 UTC (2300 EST) on 11 February just to the north of Cow Bay near the mouth of the Daintree River. The system maintained its west-northwest movement as it tracked over land, and according to the BoM maintained cyclone intensity until later that day after it had become difficult to track a definite low level centre. Over the next 24 hours the JTWC continued to track Rona as a tropical cyclone as it moved through the Great Dividing Range. Late on 12 February, the JTWC issued their final advisory on Rona after the system had weakened below cyclone intensity and deep convection, associated with the system had dissipated despite fair upper-level outflow. The JTWC subsequently tracked Rona's remnants into the Gulf of Carpentaria, however over the next few days the BoM tracked the systems remnant low to mid-level circulation as it moved southward.

During 16 February, the system's low to mid-level circulation moved off Queensland's east coast, and tracked eastwards across the Coral Sea within the monsoon trough to the south of the subtropical ridge of high pressure. Early on February 17, the JTWC initiated advisories on the system and designated it as Tropical Cyclone 22P, while it was located about 550 km (340 mi) to the east-northeast of Rockhampton, Australia. Later on 18 February, RSMC Nadi remarked that Tropical Depression 16F had moved east of 160°E and into their area of responsibility. Meanwhile, they also noted that 16F had intensified into a category one tropical cyclone and was thus named Frank. At the time of the upgrade, the storm was centered 690 km (430 mi) west-northwest of Nouméa, New Caledonia. By this time, an upper-level trough over eastern Australia moved into the Tasman Sea. The poleward outflow of Frank improved; as a result, Frank rapidly intensified over the next 24 hours. Frank made landfall near the northern tip of New Caledonia at peak intensity with winds of 145 km/h (90 mph) at 0000 UTC on 20 February. Even though the JTWC operationally assessed the peak intensity at 185 km/h (115 mph), this was lowered to 175 km/h (110 mph) during post-storm analysis.

After making landfall on New Caledonia, Frank maintained peak intensity for 18 hours. Soon afterwards, northwesterly wind shear and cooler sea surface temperatures caused Frank to weaken rapidly. During the morning of 21 February, RSMC Nadi passed warning responsibility to Meteorological Service of New Zealand Limited (TCWC Wellington) as the cyclone had moved south of 25°S. Roughly 18 hours later, Frank merged with a trough to form an intense extratropical cyclone, which eventually made landfall on the South Island of New Zealand near Westport. The system was last noted by MetService during 27 February while it was located about 490 km (305 mi) to the southeast of Wellington, New Zealand.

== Impact and aftermath ==
Wettest tropical cyclones and their remnants in Australia Highest-known totals
Precipitation			Storm	Location	Ref.
Rank	mm	in	Storm	Location	Ref.
1	2,252	88.66	Jasper 2023	Bairds	
2	1,947	76.65	Peter 1979	Mount Bellenden Ker	
3	1,870	73.62	Rona 1999	Mount Bellenden Ker	
4	1,318	51.89	Wanda 1974	Mount Glorious	
5	1,256.8	49.48	Fletcher 2014	Kowanyama	
6	1,111	43.74	Alfred 2025	Upper Springbrook	
7	1,082	42.60	Aivu 1989	Dalrymple Heights	
8	1,065	41.93	May 1998	Burketown	
9	1,000	39.37	Justin 1997	Willis Island	
10	1,000	39.37	Ellie 2009		

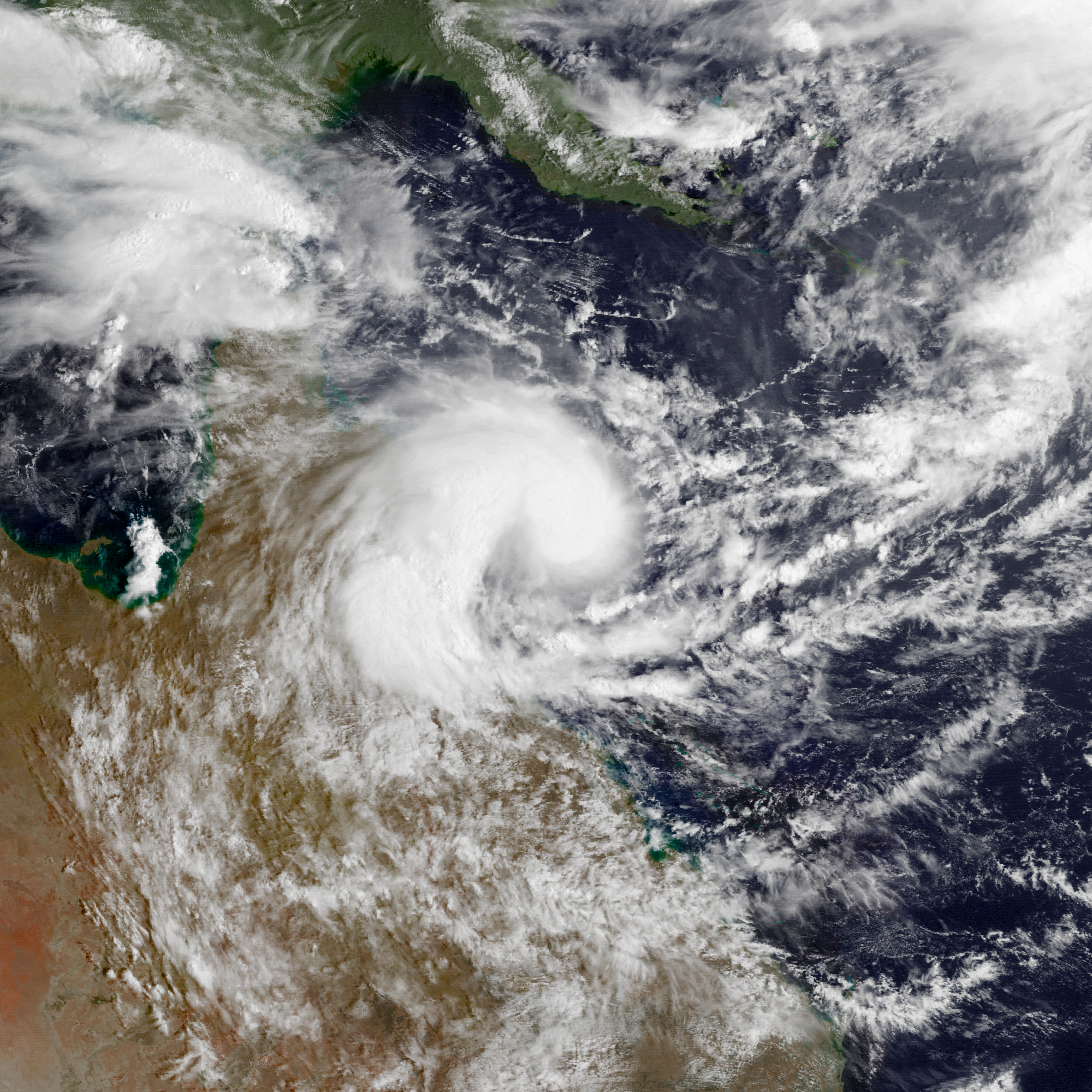
Satellite image of Severe Tropical Cyclone Rona near landfall on Queensland.

=== Australia ===
Initially, the system was not considered a major threat to Queensland. A day prior to landfall, the system was only considered a tropical low and was not expecting to intensify. Most residents did not know a powerful storm was coming until four hours before landfall. However, once officials realized that Rona was a serious threat, they started taking precautions. In fact, they feared that if the storm struck at high tide, Townsville would be devastated. All air travel was cancelled about a day before landfall.

Upon making landfall in Queensland, Cyclone Rona a maximum storm surge of 1.4 m (4.6 ft) was noted at the mouth of the Mossman River while a 1 m (3.3 ft) storm surge was recorded in Port Douglas. The highest rains associated with Rona, 1,870 millimetres (73.6 in), were measured at Bellenden Ker in Northern Queensland. Cyclone Rona was responsible for the worst flooding in northern Queensland in 30 years. As a result, 2,000 people fled their homes. Strong winds and flooding caused significant crop and infrastructure damage from Cape Kimberly to Cape Tribulation. In the former, some trees were toppled. Near Daintree, two homes were destroyed, while 12 others were damaged. In addition, a car was crushed by a falling tree. Many workers were unable to get home due to flooding and travel was disrupted throughout the region. In all, seven deaths were attributed to the storm and damage estimates from Cyclone Rona totaled $150 million (1999 USD) in Queensland with roughly $100 million of that coming from crop damage.

On 12 February, a disaster area was declared for Cairns and Innisfail due to the severity of damage caused by the storm. Platypuses were spotted along the banks of flooded rivers. Both the names Frank and Rona were retired from the lists of tropical cyclone names after the system had dissipated.

=== New Caledonia ===
Cyclone Frank affected two thirds of New Caledonia's Grande Terre island between 20–21 February. Several townships within the north-western parts of the archipelago suffered from power outages, disruption to water supply and telecommunications, while some landslides were reported on coastal roads. Despite the systems center passing about 30 km (20 mi) to the west of Noumea, the city experienced relatively light winds as the system possessed a very small radius of damaging winds.

Royal New Zealand Air Force Orion and the Royal Australian Air Force launched a search and rescue mission during 22 February, after three men whose yacht had sunk went missing. The men were subsequently found by the Orion during the next day, while located about 547 km (340 mi) to the southwest of Nouméa just outside the search zone. The French Navy vessel Jacques Cartier, subsequently picked the sailors up later that day.

== See also ==
- List of wettest tropical cyclones
- List of Queensland tropical cyclones
