= Cyclone Peter =

Australian region cyclone in 1978–1979

Severe Tropical Cyclone Peter
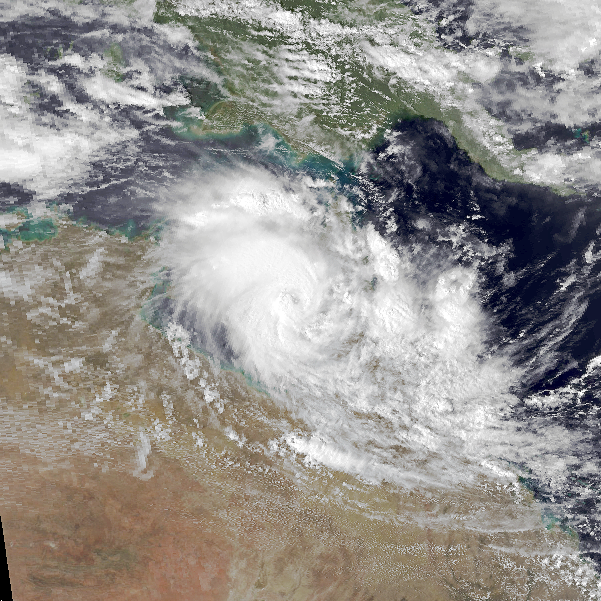
- Cyclone Peter near peak intensity on 31 December

Meteorological history
- Formed: 28 December 1978
- Dissipated: 3 January 1979

Category 3 severe tropical cyclone
- 10-minute sustained (BOM)
- Highest winds: 150 km/h (90 mph)
- Lowest pressure: 980 hPa (mbar); 28.94 inHg

Tropical storm
- 1-minute sustained (SSHWS/JTWC)
- Highest winds: 110 km/h (70 mph)
- Lowest pressure: 980 hPa (mbar); 28.94 inHg

Overall effects
- Fatalities: 2 total
- Damage: $11.4 million (1978 USD)
- Areas affected: Northern Territory, Far North Queensland
- IBTrACS
- Part of the 1978–79 Australian region cyclone season

Severe Tropical Cyclone Peter was at the time, the wettest tropical cyclone on record in Australia, until it was surpassed by Cyclone Jasper in 2023. The third system and first severe tropical cyclone of the 1978–79 season, Peter developed on 29 December from a weak low pressure area over the Gulf of Carpentaria. Peter moved southeastward and deepened while brushing Arnhem Land. Initially a tropical low, it strengthened into a Category 1 cyclone by 12:00 UTC on 29 December. Peter intensified further on 30 December and became a Category 2 cyclone. On the following day, the cyclone peaked with maximum sustained winds of 110 km/h (70 mph). Peter weakened to a Category 1 cyclone before making landfall near the mouth of the Edward River in Queensland. While crossing the Cape York Peninsula, the storm weakened slowly. After reaching Pacific Ocean near Cooktown, the storm decelerated and meandered offshore, but dissipated just offshore on 4 January.

While trekking slowly offshore the east coast of Queensland, the storm dropped very heavy rainfall, peaking at 1,947 millimetres (76.7 in) at Mount Bellenden Ker, making it the wettest tropical cyclone on record in Australia at the time. Severe flooding occurred, especially in the Cairns area. The most severe damage was dealt to sugar cane, which suffered 70 to 90 percent destruction. Some flights were canceled at the Cairns Airport due to standing water. Floodwaters forced at least 50 people to flee their homes in Cairns. A number of roads, including major highways, were flooded throughout coastal areas of Far North Queensland. Rainfall and winds also resulted in many power and telephone service outages through the region. There were two fatalities and damage reached approximately $10 million (1979 AUD; $11.4 million 1979 USD).

== Meteorological history ==
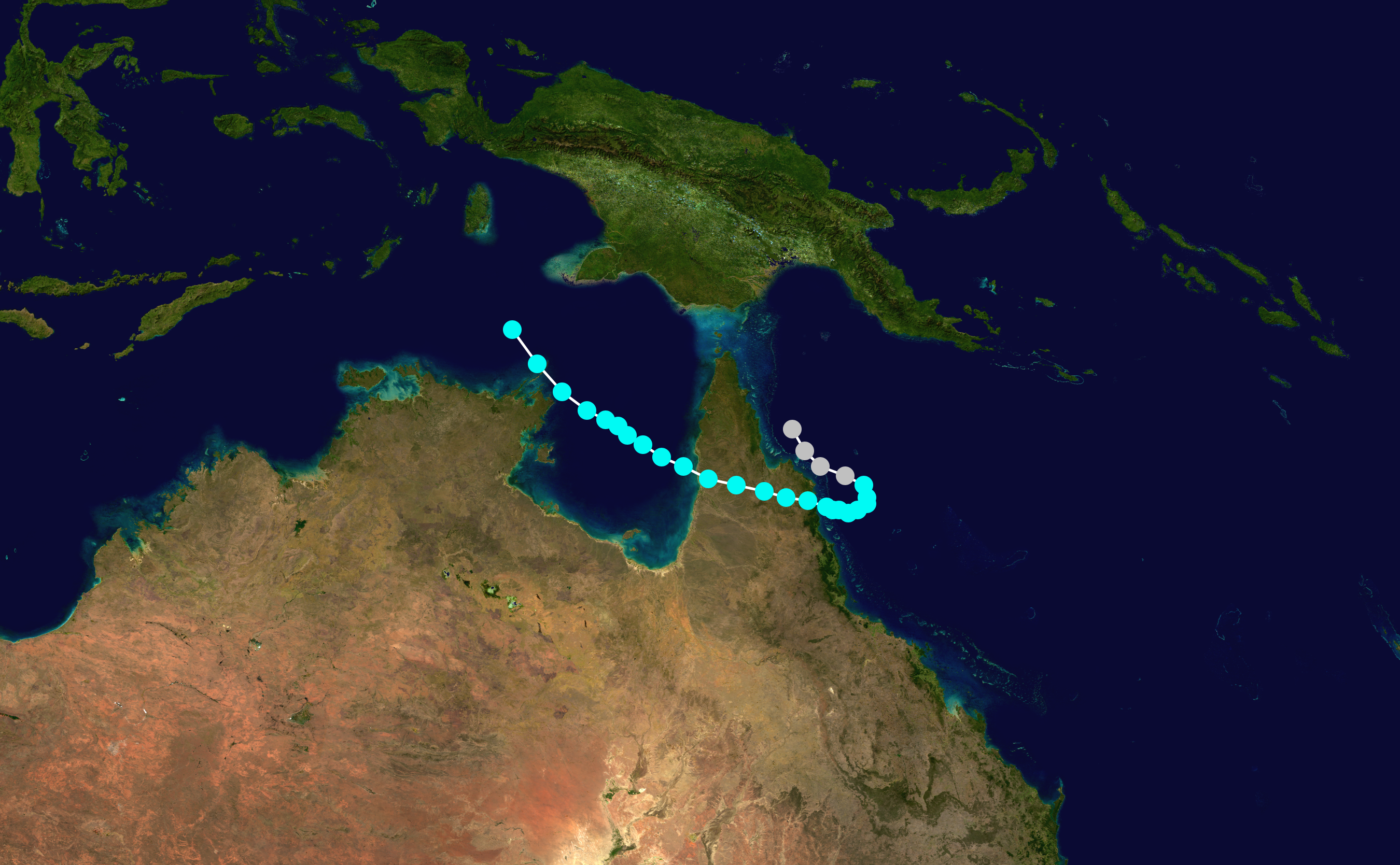
Map plotting the storm's track and intensity, according to the Saffir–Simpson scale Map key Saffir–Simpson scale Tropical depression (≤38 mph, ≤62 km/h) Tropical storm (39–73 mph, 63–118 km/h) Category 1 (74–95 mph, 119–153 km/h) Category 2 (96–110 mph, 154–177 km/h) Category 3 (111–129 mph, 178–208 km/h) Category 4 (130–156 mph, 209–251 km/h) Category 5 (≥157 mph, ≥252 km/h) Unknown Storm type Tropical cyclone Subtropical cyclone Extratropical cyclone, remnant low, tropical disturbance, or monsoon depression

During the final week of December 1978, an area of atmospheric convection developed over northern Australia and surrounding areas. During 28 December, an area of low pressure developed over the eastern Arnhem Land within this area of atmospheric convection. Over the next day the system moved northwestward toward the Gulf of Carpentaria and developed further, with the first gale force wind associated with the system reported from an automatic weather station on 29 December. The system was subsequently named Peter by the Australian Bureau of Meteorology (BoM) after it moved into the Gulf and developed into a Category 1 tropical cyclone on the Australian tropical cyclone intensity scale. After being named, Peter continued to intensify further as it tracked southeastward toward the Cape York Peninsula.

The system was subsequently considered to have peaked as a Category 2 tropical cyclone on 31 December, with 10-minute sustained winds estimated at 110 km/h (70 mph) by the BoM. Several hours later, the system made landfall between Aurukun and the Edward River mission, Queensland, at around 20:00 (Australian Eastern Standard Time, 11:00 UTC). As Peter made landfall during 31 December winds of 120 km/h (75 mph), were reported from both Fitzroy Island and the Edward River mission weather stations. Over the next couple of days the system gradually weakened over land, before it emerged into the Coral Sea near Cooktown, Queensland, on 1 January. The system subsequently weakened below tropical cyclone intensity and became a tropical low during 2 January. The system was last noted on the following day as it degenerated into a complex low pressure system and moved back over the Cape York Peninsula. The complex low subsequently moved westwards over the Peninsula and into the Gulf, where it developed into Tropical Cyclone Greta.

== Impact ==
Wettest tropical cyclones and their remnants in Australia Highest-known totals
Precipitation			Storm	Location	Ref.
Rank	mm	in	Storm	Location	Ref.
1	2,252	88.66	Jasper 2023	Bairds	
2	1,947	76.65	Peter 1979	Mount Bellenden Ker	
3	1,870	73.62	Rona 1999	Mount Bellenden Ker	
4	1,318	51.89	Wanda 1974	Mount Glorious	
5	1,256.8	49.48	Fletcher 2014	Kowanyama	
6	1,111	43.74	Alfred 2025	Upper Springbrook	
7	1,082	42.60	Aivu 1989	Dalrymple Heights	
8	1,065	41.93	May 1998	Burketown	
9	1,000	39.37	Justin 1997	Willis Island	
10	1,000	39.37	Ellie 2009		

The Darwin Tropical Cyclone Warning Centre (TCWC) in Northern Territory issued a cyclone warning on 30 December for the coast of Arnhem Land from the Wessel Islands to Port Roper, located near the mouth of the Roper River. Although a cyclone warning indicates expectation of landfall, Peter would never strike Northern Territory. The strongest observed winds in the territory was 74 km/h (46 mph) on Northeast Island, while the highest precipitation total was 140 millimetres (5.5 in) in Nhulunbuy, 107 mm (4.2 in) of which fell in 24 hours. Very rough seas were reported along the coast of some areas, beaching a 12 m (39 ft) fishing vessel onto the rocks at Gove harbour.

In Queensland, the Brisbane TCWC issued cyclone watches and flood warnings as the storm passed over the Cape York Peninsula. Some areas experienced strong winds, with gusts up to 110 km/h (68 mph) at Edward River Aboriginal Mission and Fitzroy Island. The storm dropped very heavy rainfall while drifting offshore Queensland, with Mount Bellenden Ker recording 1,947 mm (76.7 in) over a period of approximately three days, making Peter the wettest tropical cyclone in Australia at the time. The record precipitation total was surpassed by Cyclone Jasper in December 2023, which dropped 2,252 mm (88.7 in) over a seven day period. In a 24 hour period, Peter dropped about 1,140 mm (45 in) of rainfall, which was the country's highest daily rainfall total. Other significant precipitation amounts included 433 mm (17.0 in) in Millaa Millaa and 402 mm (15.8 in) in Cooktown.

Due to the heavy rainfall, severe flooding occurred, mostly between Tully and Cooktown, with the worst impact in the Cairns area. Many creeks and rivers, such as the Herbert, the north and south branches of the Johnstone, and McLeod rivers overflowed or reached dangerous levels. Much of the damage in North Queensland occurred to newly planted sugar cane, with approximately 70 to 90 percent of area's crop destroyed. Twenty growers in Goondi each lost between $20,000 to $30,000 in sugar cane. Damage to this crop was comparable to the floods in 1977. In total, the storm destroyed 270,000 to 315,000 tonnes of sugar cane.

Standing water at Cairns Airport led Ansett Australia to cancel some flights. Portions of many roads, including major highways such as the Bruce, Captain Cook, Gillies, and Kennedy highways were reported by the Royal Automobile Club as closed due to inundation and washouts. Many motorists were left stranded by floodwaters on Bruce Highway. Emergency personnel crews were put on standby in Innisfail as water up to 60 cm (24 in) threatened dozens of homes in the eastern part of town. In Cairns, over 50 people fled their homes. On 5 January, the Coast Guard of Australia began evacuating some 160 stranded campers in areas about 140 km (85 mi) north of Mossman. Foods shortages occurred in some areas of Far North Queensland, forcing several emergency food drops, including to about 250 people on 4 January and 70 people on 5 January. Additionally, a policeman was winched by helicopter to deliver food supplies to 10 isolated people on 7 January in Goldsborough, which is located in the Gillies Range to the west of Gordonvale. Overall, Peter left two fatalities and about $10 million (1979 AUD) in damage, at least $4.5 million of which was done to sugar cane in Babinda, Innisfail, and Tully.

After the storm, the Government of Queensland declared the Cairns area as a natural disaster area. About week later, the Cabinet supported a measure by Minister for Primary Industries, Vic Sullivan, to offer low-interest loans to farmer who lost significant amounts of crops and livestock. Later, Queensland Premier Joh Bjelke-Petersen requested aid from the national government. Prime Minister Malcolm Fraser approved low-interest loans up to $25,000 (1979 AUD) for small businesses and the implementation of other measures for recovery.

== See also ==
- List of wettest tropical cyclones
- Floods in Australia
- List of Queensland tropical cyclones

- Cyclones Rona and Frank - Would produce the 2nd highest rainfall accumulations in Australia
