= Cyclone Justin =

Category 3 Australian region cyclone in 1997

Severe Tropical Cyclone Justin
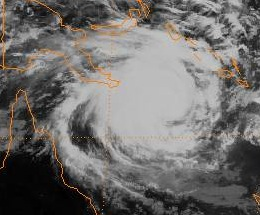
- Justin near peak intensity on 17 March

Meteorological history
- Formed: 6 March 1997
- Dissipated: 24 March 1997

Category 3 severe tropical cyclone
- 10-minute sustained (BOM)
- Highest winds: 150 km/h (90 mph)
- Highest gusts: 165 km/h (105 mph)
- Lowest pressure: 955 hPa (mbar); 28.20 inHg

Category 2-equivalent tropical cyclone
- 1-minute sustained (SSHWS/JTWC)
- Highest winds: 165 km/h (105 mph)
- Lowest pressure: 954 hPa (mbar); 28.17 inHg

Overall effects
- Fatalities: 34 total
- Damage: $190 million (1997 USD)
- Areas affected: Solomon Islands, Papua New Guinea, Queensland
- IBTrACS
- Part of the 1996–97 Australian region cyclone season

Severe Tropical Cyclone Justin was a destructive and erratic tropical cyclone which caused seven deaths and had a major economic impact in northern Queensland, Australia. It had a long 3 1/2-week life from 6 March to 24 March 1997. Peaking as a Category 3 cyclone and making landfall as a Category 2, it caused significant damage in the Cairns region, which it approached on two occasions. Houses were undermined by huge waves, a marina and boats were severely damaged, roads and bridges suffered from flood and landslide damage and huge losses were inflicted on sugar cane, fruit and vegetable crops. The death toll in Queensland was seven including five on a yacht which sank. There were 26 who died in Papua New Guinea, which was also severely affected. Total estimated costs from damages in Australia were $190 million (1997 values).

== Meteorological history ==
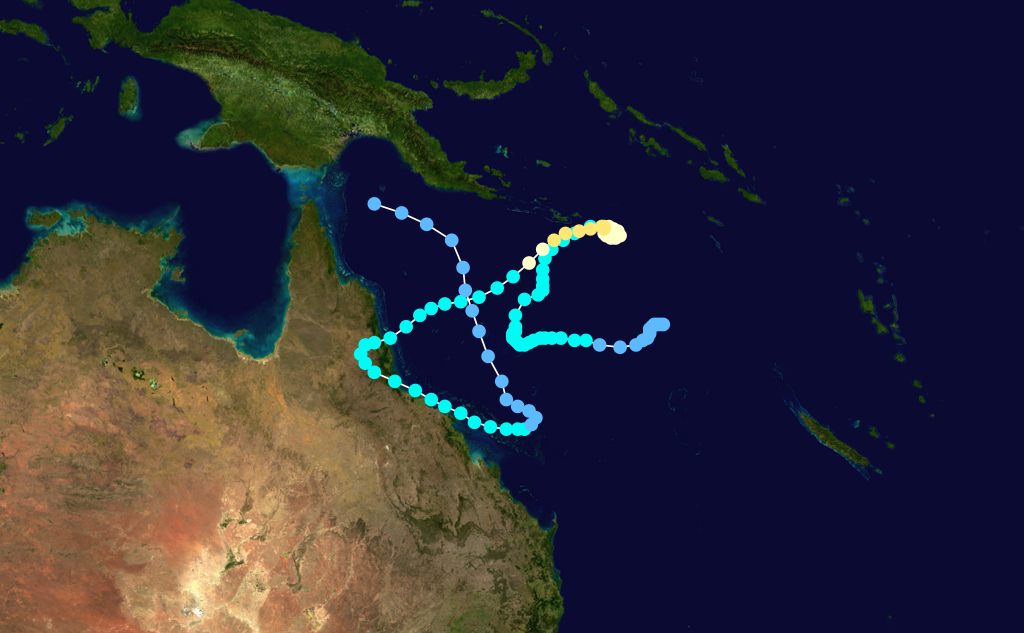
Map plotting the storm's track and intensity, according to the Saffir–Simpson scale Map key Saffir–Simpson scale Tropical depression (≤38 mph, ≤62 km/h) Tropical storm (39–73 mph, 63–118 km/h) Category 1 (74–95 mph, 119–153 km/h) Category 2 (96–110 mph, 154–177 km/h) Category 3 (111–129 mph, 178–208 km/h) Category 4 (130–156 mph, 209–251 km/h) Category 5 (≥157 mph, ≥252 km/h) Unknown Storm type Tropical cyclone Subtropical cyclone Extratropical cyclone, remnant low, tropical disturbance, or monsoon depression

On 3 March 1997 the Australian Bureau of Meteorology (BoM) observed multiple areas of low pressure across the Coral Sea. Over the next couple of days, these low pressure systems organized and consolidated, and on 7 March local time the cyclone was named Justin.

Justin slowly strengthened and increased in size for a few days after its formation, reaching 10-minute sustained wind speeds of 60 knots (69 mph; 110 km/h) on 9 March. On that day, strong winds resulted in extensive damage and loss of life occurred in parts of Papua New Guinea, as well as downed trees and severe beach erosion in central Queensland. Over the subsequent four days, the storm moved very slowly to the north, weakening as it went due to cooler sea surface temperatures and increasing vertical wind shear. During this time it passed near Willis Island, dropping record rainfall of more than 1 metre (39 in) on the island. On 13 March, the storm reached warmer waters and began to re-intensify as it continued to drift slowly to the northeast.

Justin curved back towards the south on 16 March, and began to rapidly intensify. On 17 March, it reached peak intensity with sustained winds of 80 knots (92 mph; 150 km/h). Strong winds again began to affect Papua New Guinea, causing widespread damage and leaving around 12,000 people homeless. On 19 March, the storm again began to weaken due to wind shear and passing over its previous path with cool water temperatures, and by 20 March the storm had sustained winds of only 45 knots (52 mph; 83 km/h). However, yet again the storm reached warm waters and lesser wind shear, and began intensifying again as it approached the coast of Queensland.

On 22 March, Justin made landfall north of Cairns, Queensland, Australia. Despite being over land, Justin maintained deep atmospheric convection as it moved southeast towards Townsville. However, wind shear again increased, causing the storm to rapidly weaken, dissipating entirely early on 24 March just off the coast of Queensland.

== Impact ==
Severe Tropical Cyclone Justin caused 37 deaths and had a significant impact on the Solomon Islands, Papua New Guinea and Queensland, Australia. As a result, the name Justin was retired because of the impact of this system.

=== Papua New Guinea ===
Being a long-lived storm with a wandering motion, Justin produced major winds across Papua New Guinea that caused major damage on two occasions, once around 10 March and again around 17 March. Around 30 people were killed in the country, with another 12,000 left homeless.

=== Solomon Islands ===
Cyclone Justin affected the Solomon Islands between March 15–19, with heavy rain causing landslides and extensive damage to the Solomon Islands.

=== Queensland ===
==== Economic ====
Cyclone Justin left a devastating path of destruction that had a major economic impact. Its storm force winds, which reached up to 150 km/h, caused extensive damage to banana, sugar cane and pawpaw crops. This resulted in an overall loss $205 million, including $150 million to the agricultural industry. This also resulted in expensive prices of Bananas and Pawpaws all over the country as there was a great demand for them but not enough products. Cyclone Justin's storm force winds also caused severe damage to power lines, which resulted in the power being out for 36 hours. Consequently, many businesses could not operate and some businesses lost perishable goods due to their fridges and freezers being unable to prevent food from going off. All of this resulted in a loss of income. Unemployment was also a major consequence of Cyclone Justin's destruction. The destruction of crops eliminated the need for truck drivers to transport the goods and harvesters to harvest the crops. Other jobs were also affected such as those in tourism, as holiday-makers avoided the area until the wreckages had been cleaned up. On the other hand, the building industry and manufacturers flourished as the need to repair to replace goods/buildings, which had been destroyed or damaged by Cyclone Justin, was tremendously high. With damage to many buildings, vehicles, produce and other items, thousands of insurances claims were made. Some insurance premiums then rose so that the companies could cover the cost of the claims.

==== Human ====
The cyclone resulted in at least 2 fatalities within the state, a woman was killed in a landslide which was triggered by the excessive rainfall, and a boy was electrocuted by a falling power line. There were also 5 deaths that occurred when a yacht was destroyed. The areas affected were very close knit communities, and so, when these fatalities occurred everybody was devastated. This resulted in the communities being brought together by their shared experiences and underlying grief. Many of the other social impacts of Cyclone Justin go hand in hand with the economic ones. For instance, some farmers' only source of income is their crops, so when their crops were destroyed they did not have anything left. This devastation caused mental health crises within the community.

==== Environmental ====
The environmental impact of Cyclone Justin was large and varied. The Great Barrier Reef was one of the most significant locations which were damaged by the cyclone. With a limited width of open water, the Barrier Reef is, as its name suggests, a barrier to the land against high swells. Although this means that the land is relatively well protected, the reef is exposed to high swells and large waves. When Cyclone Justin hit some parts, mainly around Heron Island and the Whitsundays, of the Great Barrier Reef's ecosystem were severely damaged. This is because Justin's extreme wave power caused the break-up of corals which many fish and other organisms relied on to live; in turn, this affected the larger organisms which relied on these smaller organisms to live, and so on. Some experts believe, however, that the break-up of hard corals is a positive impact as it is simply part of the reef's life cycle. Cyclone Justin also impacted the beaches along Northern Queensland. Many beaches experienced acute erosion due to high tides and storm surge. As well as this saltwater inundated many areas, specifically from Cooktown to Fraser Island. Many plants have an extremely low tolerance to saltwater and for that reason, a significant amount of vegetation along the coast died.

== See also ==
- Tropical cyclones in 1997
- List of Queensland tropical cyclones

- Cyclone Owen (2018)
- Cyclone Jasper (2023)
