= Cyclone Kirrily =

Category 3 Australian region cyclone in 2024

Severe Tropical Cyclone Kirrily
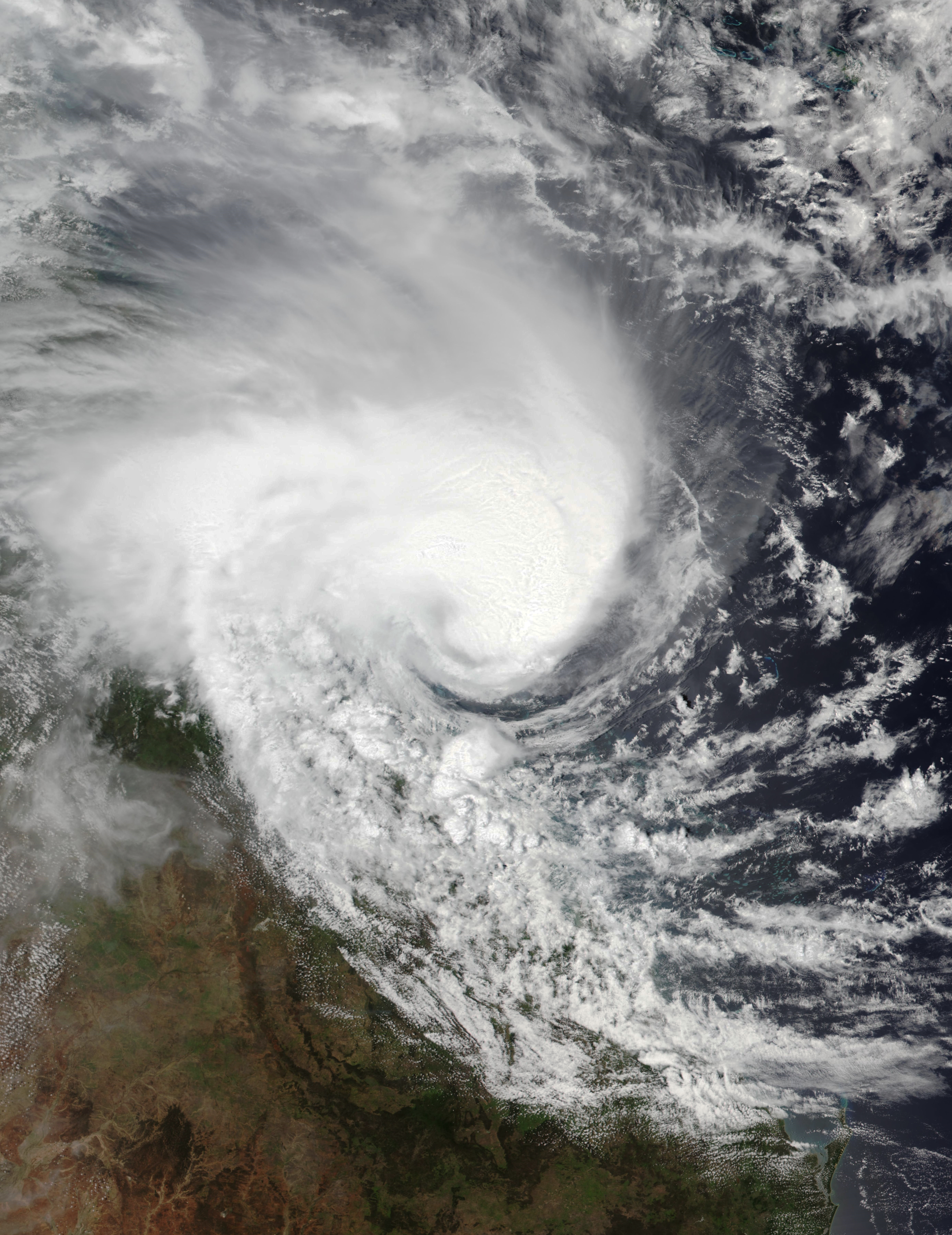
- Cyclone Kirrily near peak intensity on 25 January

Meteorological history
- Formed: 12 January 2024
- Remnant low: 25 January 2024
- Dissipated: 5 February 2024
- Duration: 3 weeks and 3 days

Category 3 severe tropical cyclone
- 10-minute sustained (BOM)
- Highest winds: 120 km/h (75 mph)
- Highest gusts: 165 km/h (105 mph)
- Lowest pressure: 978 hPa (mbar); 28.88 inHg

Tropical storm
- 1-minute sustained (SSHWS/JTWC)
- Highest winds: 100 km/h (65 mph)
- Lowest pressure: 985 hPa (mbar); 29.09 inHg

Overall effects
- Fatalities: None
- Damage: $120 million (2024 USD)
- Areas affected: Queensland, Northern Territory, South Australia, New South Wales
- Part of the 2023–24 Australian region cyclone season

Severe Tropical Cyclone Kirrily was a long-lived and moderately strong tropical cyclone that affected East Australia and the Northern Territory during January and February 2024. The third named storm and severe tropical cyclone of the 2023–24 Australian region cyclone season, Kirrily developed from a tropical low that formed within the Coral Sea. The system gradually developed, being in a favorable environment for further development with good outflow, low vertical wind shear, and warm sea surface temperatures, resulting in the system becoming a tropical cyclone intensity. The storm peaked on 25 January as a Category 3 severe tropical cyclone with sustained winds of 120 km/h (75 mph) and a minimum barometric pressure of 978 hPa (28.88 inHg). Kirrily made landfall northwest of Townsville, Australia. Kirrily weakened steadily as it tracked northwestward along the coast and was downgraded to a tropical low later that day. However, Kirrily remained traceable, as it moved westwards towards the Queensland region throughout the rest of January. The system only produced near-gale-force winds in the Gulf of Carpentaria, the Australian Bureau of Meteorology (BoM) determined that the low was not expected to redevelop into a tropical cyclone. Kirrily accelerated inland with the rainbands unraveling and warming cloud tops, until it was last noted on the BoM tropical cyclone outlooks on 3 February.

No fatalities resulted from Kirrily; the cyclone caused minimal damage near the area of landfall with some trees lost and minor roof damage. Heavy rainfall was recorded in some areas of Queensland but was low around the area of landfall. However, the remnant low of Kirrily fed severe thunderstorms in Southeast Queensland, prompting a superstorm warning from the BoM. Losses were estimated up to $120 million.

== Meteorological history ==
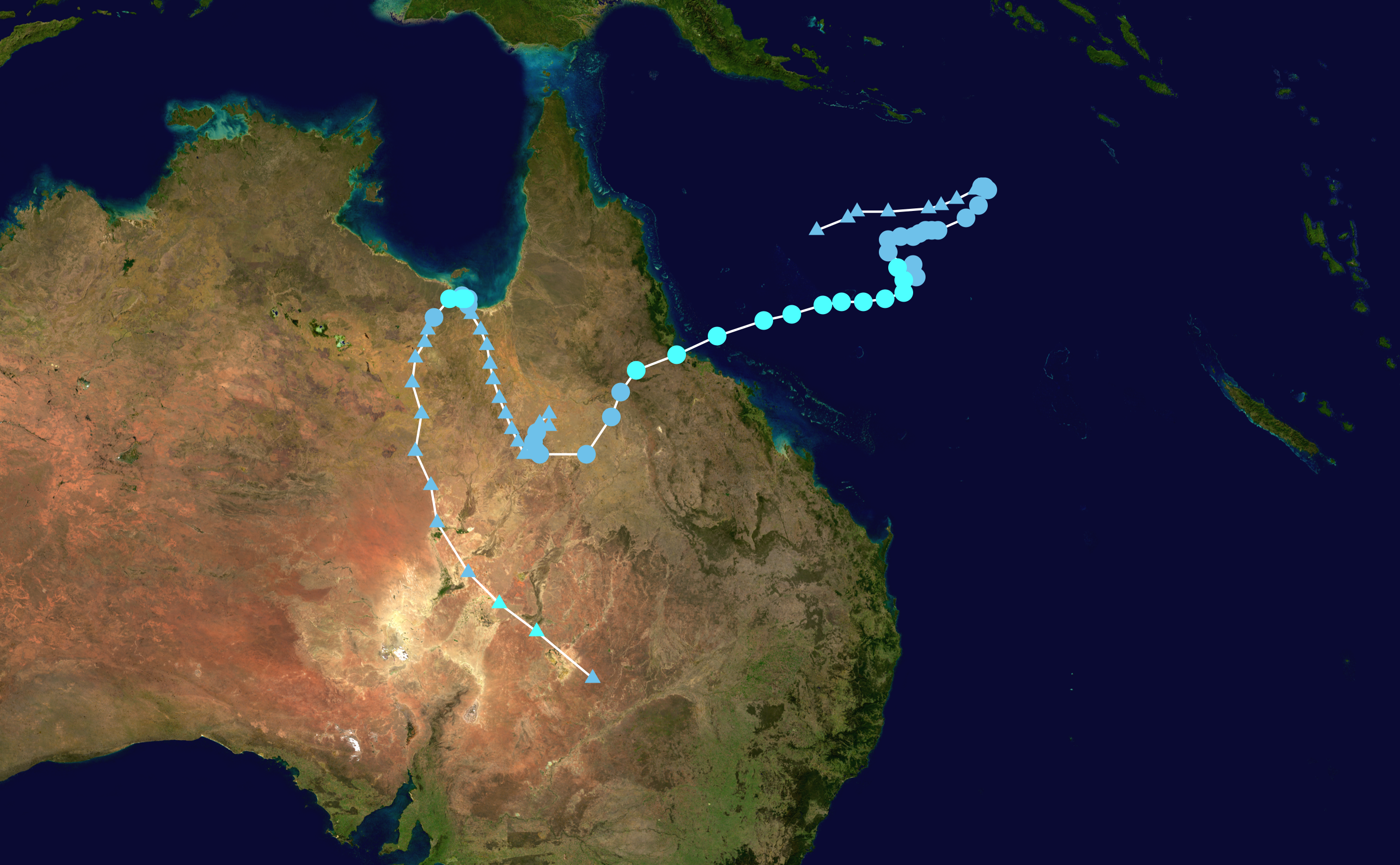
Map plotting the storm's track and intensity, according to the Saffir–Simpson scale Map key Saffir–Simpson scale Tropical depression (≤38 mph, ≤62 km/h) Tropical storm (39–73 mph, 63–118 km/h) Category 1 (74–95 mph, 119–153 km/h) Category 2 (96–110 mph, 154–177 km/h) Category 3 (111–129 mph, 178–208 km/h) Category 4 (130–156 mph, 209–251 km/h) Category 5 (≥157 mph, ≥252 km/h) Unknown Storm type Tropical cyclone Subtropical cyclone Extratropical cyclone, remnant low, tropical disturbance, or monsoon depression

On 9 January, the Australian Bureau of Meteorology (BoM) noted the possibility of a tropical low forming within the monsoon trough over the Gulf of Carpentaria, designating it as 05U. Three days later, the BoM reported that it was developing over the eastern portion of the gulf. However, the low remained weak and moved eastwards, entering the Coral Sea by 16 January. By the next day, the United States Joint Typhoon Warning Center (JTWC) began monitoring the low, as it was within a favorable environment for further development with good outflow, low vertical wind shear, and warm (29–30 °C) sea surface temperatures. Two days later, on 19 January, the JTWC issued a Tropical Cyclone Formation Alert (TCFA) for the system, as formative banding was wrapping towards its centre. On the morning of 21 January, the BoM started issuing warnings on 05U. By 23 January, the JTWC followed suit, recognizing it as Tropical Cyclone 07P.

The next day, the BoM upgraded the disturbance to a Category 1 tropical cyclone on the Australian scale and assigned it the name Kirrily. Although Kirrily initially struggled due to vertical wind shear displacing deep convection. The cyclone continued to strengthen as convective rainbands began to wrap into the system's center, with the system's structure becoming asymmetrical. On 25 January, Kirrily subsequently intensified to a Category 3 severe tropical cyclone, with estimated maximum 10-minute sustained winds of 120 km/h (75 mph), and a central barometric pressure of 978 hPa (28.88 inHg). The JTWC followed suit the system and upgraded it to a Category 1 hurricane on the Saffir–Simpson hurricane wind scale (SSHWS). As the system turned to the westward, it encountered increased wind shear, prior to make landfall near Townsville at 22:00 AEST (12:00 UTC) with sustained winds of 85 km/h (50 mph). Shortly after the landfall, the JTWC discontinued warnings on the system. Later that day, the BoM reported that Kirrily had weakened to a tropical low. However, Kirrily remained traceable, as it moved westwards towards the Queensland region throughout the rest of January.

RBTOP-enhanced infrared imagery of Tropical Cyclone Kirrily making landfall over Queensland, Australia on January 25, 2024.

Towards the end of January, the JTWC began monitoring the remnants of Kirrily for potential regeneration as the system developed a partially exposed low-level circulation center (LLCC). Early the next day, they issued a TCFA for the remnants as they were expected to redevelop into a tropical cyclone. The remnants later regenerated into a tropical cyclone; the system showed a consolidating LLCC with convective banding and a central dense overcast (CDO). Since the system only produced near-gale-force winds in the Gulf of Carpentaria, the BoM determined that the low was not expected to redevelop into a tropical cyclone. By 2 February, the JTWC discontinued the issuing of advisories again, as the storm accelerated inland and rapidly decayed further with the rainbands unraveling and warming cloud tops. Kirrily delivered sustained heavy rainfall to large areas of Queensland and the Northern Territory during its track across the northwest of Queensland, until it was last noted on the BoM tropical cyclone outlooks by the next day.

== Impact ==
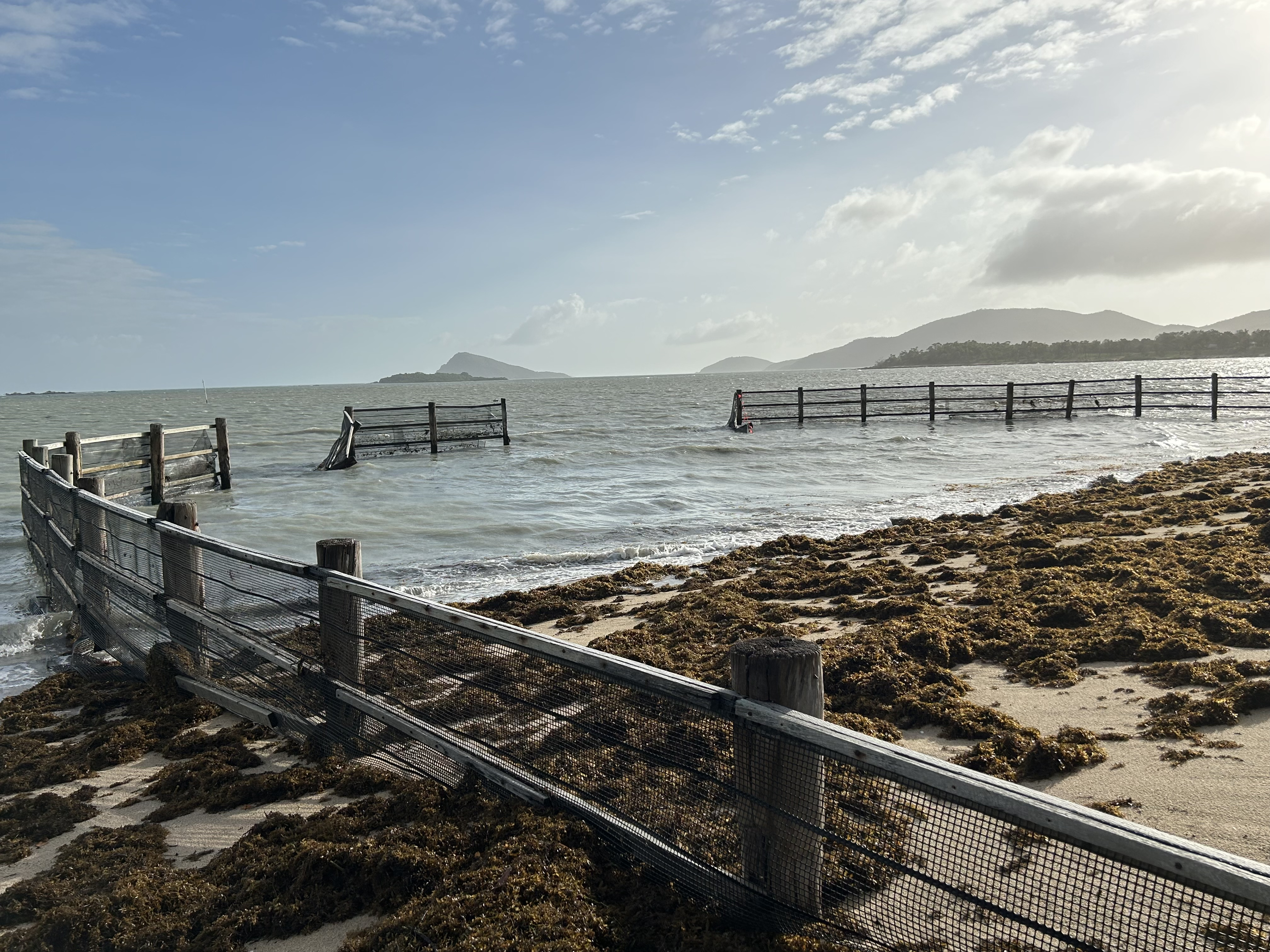
Damaged swimming enclosure after Cyclone Kirrily, 26 January 2024

Before the storm made landfall on 24 January, the Australian Bureau of Meteorology (BoM) issued cyclone warnings for Townsville, Mackay, Bowen, and the Whitsunday Islands, which extended inland to Charters Towers. Over 100 schools were closed while airlines and railways cancelled their services in anticipation of the storm. In Hamilton, a community refuge center was opened to provide shelter. Additionally, military personnel were on standby to assist in the aftermath. On 25 January, over 65,000 were without power in Queensland as Kirrily tracked inland, primarily in Townsville, where nearly 34,000 homes and buildings were without power.

Three days later, over 100,000 were without power due to Kirrily. Heavy rainfall occurred, with rainfall amounting to 100–150 mm (3.9–5.9 in) being recorded throughout Queensland. Seymour saw 256 mm (10.1 in) of rain in a 24-hour period, whereas Kirby saw 244 mm (9.6 in). Isolated intense rainfall up to 300 mm (12 in) also occurred. Authorities rescued fourteen people who were stranded in floodwaters while trying to inspect the impact of the storm. The remnant low of Kirrily fed severe thunderstorms in Southeast Queensland, prompting a superstorm warning from the BoM. In the aftermath of the storm, the Australian government issued disaster insurance to people affected, with grants for the Townsville and Burdekin shires issued as they suffered the brunt of the storm, while the Queensland government offered up to AU$900 (US$593) to households affected by the storm.

== See also ==
- Tropical cyclones in 2024
- Weather of 2024
- Cyclone Oswald (2013) – another tropical cyclone which stalled and meandered over Queensland for several days
