= List of Category 5 South Pacific severe tropical cyclones =

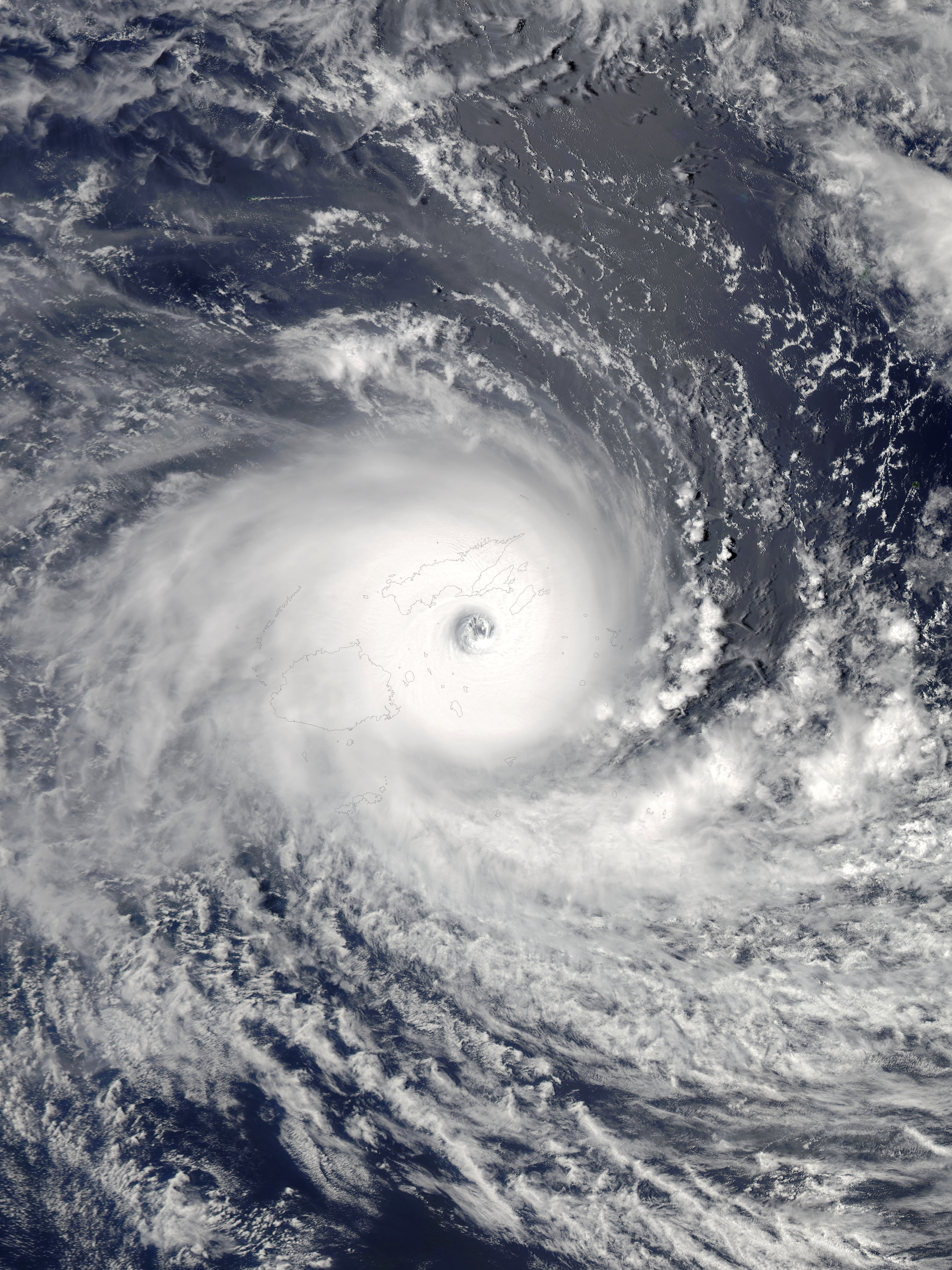
Winston at record peak intensity near Fiji on 20 February 2016

A Category 5 South Pacific severe tropical cyclone is a tropical cyclone that reaches Category 5 intensity on the Australian tropical cyclone intensity scale within the South Pacific basin. They are by definition the strongest tropical cyclones that can form on Earth. A total of 21 tropical cyclones have peaked at Category 5 strength in the South Pacific tropical cyclone basin, which is denoted as the part of the Pacific Ocean to the south of the equator and to the east of 160°E. 20 of these tropical cyclones have been classified as Category 5 on the Australian tropical cyclone intensity scale, while Severe Tropical Cyclone Anne was estimated to be equivalent to a Category 5 on the Saffir–Simpson hurricane wind scale.

The earliest tropical cyclone to be classified as a Category 5 severe tropical cyclone was Hina, which was classified as a Category 5 between March 6 and 7, 1985, as it moved through the Solomon Islands. The latest system to be classified as a Category 5 severe tropical cyclone was Cyclone Lola, which was classified as such on October 24, 2023.

== Background ==
The South Pacific tropical cyclone basin is located to the south of the Equator between 160°E and 120°W. The basin is officially monitored by the Fiji Meteorological Service (FMS) and the New Zealand MetService who are the primary warning centres for the region. Other meteorological services such as the Australian Bureau of Meteorology (BoM), Météo-France (MF) as well as the United States Joint Typhoon Warning Center (JTWC) and the National Weather Service also monitor the basin. Within the basin, a Category 5 severe tropical cyclone is a tropical cyclone that has 10-minute maximum sustained wind speeds over 107 knots (198 km/h; 123 mph) or greater on the Australian tropical cyclone intensity scale. A named storm could also be classified as a Category 5 tropical cyclone if it is estimated, to have 1-minute mean maximum sustained wind speeds over 137 knots (254 km/h; 158 mph) on the Saffir–Simpson hurricane wind scale. Within the basin this scale is only officially used in American Samoa, however, systems are commonly compared to the SSHWS using 1-minute sustained windspeeds from the United States Joint Typhoon Warning Center. On both scales, a Category 5 tropical cyclone is expected to cause widespread devastation, if it significantly impacts land at or near its peak intensity.

Before the formal start of the satellite era during the 1969–70 season, there was no way of determining how intense a tropical cyclone was unless it impacted land or either a ship or a plane happened to observe it.

Over the years, the intensity estimates of tropical cyclones have been reanalysed for various reasons and were found to have been underestimated by the various warning centres.

There is not enough evidence available to make definitive conclusions about how climate change is impacting Category 5 severe tropical cyclones, however, tropical cyclones are generally expected to become stronger and more frequent in the future.

== Systems ==
Name	Duration	Peak intensity		Areas affected	Damage (USD)	Deaths	Refs
Name	Duration	Wind speed	Pressure	Areas affected	Damage (USD)	Deaths	Refs
Hina	March 10 – 19, 1985	220 km/h (140 mph)	910 hPa (26.87 inHg)	Solomon Islands, Vanuatu, Fiji	>$3 million	1	
Fran	March 4 – 11, 1992	205 km/h (125 mph)	920 hPa (27.17 inHg)	Wallis and Futuna, Fiji, Vanuatu, New Caledonia, Queensland, New Zealand	$675 million	Unknown	
Ron	January 1 – 9, 1998	230 km/h (145 mph)	900 hPa (26.58 inHg)	Samoan Islands, Wallis and Futuna, Tonga, New Zealand	$737,000	None	
Susan	December 20, 1997 – January 10, 1998	230 km/h (145 mph)	900 hPa (26.58 inHg)	Solomon Islands, Vanuatu, Fiji, New Zealand	$100,000	1	
Zoe	December 23, 2002 – January 4, 2003	240 km/h (150 mph)	890 hPa (26.28 inHg)	Solomon Islands, Vanuatu, Fiji	Severe	None	
Beni	January 19 – February 1, 2003	205 km/h (125 mph)	920 hPa (27.17 inHg)	Solomon Islands, Vanuatu, New Caledonia, Australia	$1 million	1	
Dovi	February 5 – 11, 2003	205 km/h (125 mph)	920 hPa (27.17 inHg)	Niue, Cook Islands	Minimal	None	
Erica	March 1 – 15, 2003	215 km/h (130 mph)	915 hPa (27.02 inHg)	Queensland, Solomon Islands, Vanuatu, New Caledonia	$15 million	2	
Heta	December 25, 2003 – January 11, 2004	215 km/h (130 mph)	915 hPa (27.02 inHg)	Samoan Islands, Niue, Tonga, Wallis and Futuna	$225 million	3	
Meena	February 1 – 11, 2005	215 km/h (130 mph)	915 hPa (27.02 inHg)	Cook Islands	$20 million	None	
Olaf	February 10 – 25, 2005	215 km/h (130 mph)	915 hPa (27.02 inHg)	Samoan Islands, Cook Islands	$10 million	None	
Percy	February 23 – March 5, 2005	230 km/h (145 mph)	900 hPa (26.58 inHg)	Tokelau, Samoan Islands, Cook Islands	$25 million	None	
Ului	March 9 – 21, 2010	215 km/h (130 mph)	915 hPa (27.02 inHg)	Solomon Islands, Vanuatu	Unknown	1	
Ian	January 2 – 15, 2014	205 km/h (125 mph)	930 hPa (27.46 inHg)	Fiji, Tonga	$48 million	1	
Pam	March 6 – 20, 2015	250 km/h (155 mph)	896 hPa (26.46 inHg)	Fiji, Kiribati, Solomon Islands, Tuvalu, Vanuatu, New Caledonia, New Zealand	$360 million	16	
Winston	February 18 – 21, 2016	280 km/h (175 mph)	884 hPa (26.10 inHg)	Vanuatu, Fiji, Tonga, Niue	$1.4 billion	44	
Donna	May 1 – 16, 2017	205 km/h (125 mph)	937 hPa (27.67 inHg)	Melanesia, New Zealand	$10 million	2	
Gita	February 3 – 22, 2018	205 km/h (125 mph)	927 hPa (27.37 inHg)	Solomon Islands, Vanuatu, Fiji, Niue, Wallis and Futuna, Samoan Islands, Tonga	$221 million	2	
Harold	April 1 – 11, 2020	230 km/h (145 mph)	920 hPa (27.17 inHg)	Solomon Islands, Vanuatu, Fiji, Tonga	Significant	29	
Yasa	December 11 – 24, 2020	230 km/h (145 mph)	917 hPa (27.08 inHg)	Fiji, Tonga	Significant	4	
Niran	February 25 – March 8, 2021	205 km/h (125 mph)	931 hPa (27.49 inHg)	Queensland, New Caledonia	Extensive	Unknown	
Kevin	February 27 – March 6, 2023	230 km/h (145 mph)	913 hPa (26.96 inHg)	Solomon Islands, Vanuatu, New Caledonia	Extensive		
Lola	October 23 – 27, 2023	215 km/h (130 mph)	930 hPa (27.46 inHg)	Solomon Islands, Vanuatu, New Caledonia	$373 million	1	
Xavier	November 12 – present 2026	220 km/h (140 mph)	910 hPa (26.87 inHg)	Northern Cook Islands	Unknown	Unknown	

== Other systems ==
In addition to the tropical cyclones listed above, Severe Tropical Cyclone Anne (1988) was estimated by the JTWC to have peaked with 1-minute sustained winds of 260 km/h (160 mph) for six hours on January 11, 1988. This made it equivalent to a Category 5 hurricane on the SSHWS; however, the FMS estimated that the system had peaked with 10-minute sustained winds of 185 km/h (115 mph) based on the Dvorak technique, which made it a Category 4 severe tropical cyclone on the Australian scale. Elsewhere in the South Pacific Ocean, Severe Tropical Cyclones Dominic (1982), Elinor (1983), Kathy (1984), Harry (1989), Aivu (1989), Rewa (1993–94), Theodore (1994), Monica (2006), Hamish (2009), Yasi (2011), Ita (2014), Marcia (2015), Jasper (2023), Narelle (2026) and Maila (2026) were each considered to be a Category 5 severe tropical cyclone by the BoM while located in the Australian region. During a database repair project between 2005 and 2007, the BoM discovered that Severe Tropical Cyclone Pam (1974) had been reanalysed at some point after 1979. This reanalysis showed that Pam had moved into the Australian region as a Category 5 severe tropical cyclone, however; in 2021 it was determined that the width of Pam's southern eyewall was too narrow and the BoM downgraded it to a Category 4 severe tropical cyclone. Data submitted to the International Best Track Archive for Climate Stewardship by New Zealand's MetService shows that Severe Tropical Cyclone Oscar (1983) peaked with 10-minute sustained winds of 200 km/h (130 mph).

During 2014, Météo France published the results of a reanalysis of Severe Tropical Cyclones Nisha-Orama and Veena of the 1982–83 season. In the reanalysis, they found that Nisha-Orama was the strongest tropical cyclone to impact French Polynesia on record and had peaked with 10-minute sustained winds of 228 km/h (142 mph) and a minimum pressure of 898 hPa (26.52 inHg). They also estimated that Veena had peaked with 10-minute sustained winds of 211 km/h (131 mph) and a minimum pressure of 910 hPa (26.87 inHg). During 2017, a study into extreme tropical cyclone activity in the southern Pacific Ocean was published in the Royal Meteorological Society's International Journal of Climatology. In the study, the authors reanalysed satellite images of several tropical cyclones between 1980 and 2016 using the 1984 Dvorak technique and found that 18 tropical cyclones had reached Category 5 intensity on the Saffir–Simpson hurricane wind scale. In particular, the study estimated that Severe Tropical Cyclones Nisha-Orama and Oscar of the 1982–83 season had peaked with 1-minute sustained wind speeds of 280 km/h (175 mph) and that Anne (1988) had peaked with 1-minute wind speeds of 285 km/h (180 mph). They also estimated that Severe Tropical Cyclone Hina had peaked with 1-minute sustained winds of 315 km/h (195 mph), which would make it one of the strongest tropical cyclones on record in the Southern Hemisphere.

== Land interaction ==
Off the 22 Category 5 severe tropical cyclones listed above, only Severe Tropical Cyclones: Fran, Beni, Erica, Ului, Pam, Winston, Harold, Yasa and Kevin are considered to have made landfall on a Pacific nation. Severe Tropical Cyclone's Pam, Winston, Harold and Yasa are the only systems to have made landfall while at Category 5 intensity and were considered to have caused widespread devastation to Fiji and Vanuatu. Erica directly impacted New Caledonia as a Category 5 severe tropical cyclone, however, it had markedly weakened, before it made landfall on New Caledonia's main island.

Severe Tropical Cyclone's Fran, Beni and Ului all made landfall on Queensland, Australia. In addition to these six systems making landfall, several systems have either threatened or passed very near to various smaller islands at their peak intensity. In particular, Fran passed in between the islands of Efate and Erromango in Vanuatu during March 9, 1992 while Susan threatened Vanuatu during January 5, 1998, but recurved in time to spare the island nation a direct hit. At around 18:00 UTC on January 6, 1998, Severe Tropical Cyclone Ron passed within 10 km (5 mi) of the Tongan island of Niuafo'ou. Severe Tropical Cyclone Zoe passed near or over several of the Solomon Islands within Temotu Province during December 2002.

During 2020, Cyclone Harold made landfall on northern Vanuatu as a Category 5 severe tropical cyclone, before later impacting Fiji and Tonga as a Category 4 severe tropical cyclone. Later that year, Cyclone Yasa made landfall in Fiji as a Category 5 severe tropical cyclone with sustained winds of 240 km/h (150 mph) and momentary gusts of 345 km/h (215 mph). Severe Tropical Cyclone Niran subsequently skirted the coast of New Caledonia as it weakened into a Category 3 Severe Tropical Cyclone.

== See also ==
- List of Category 5 Atlantic hurricanes
- List of Category 5 Pacific hurricanes
