= List of Category 4 South Pacific severe tropical cyclones =

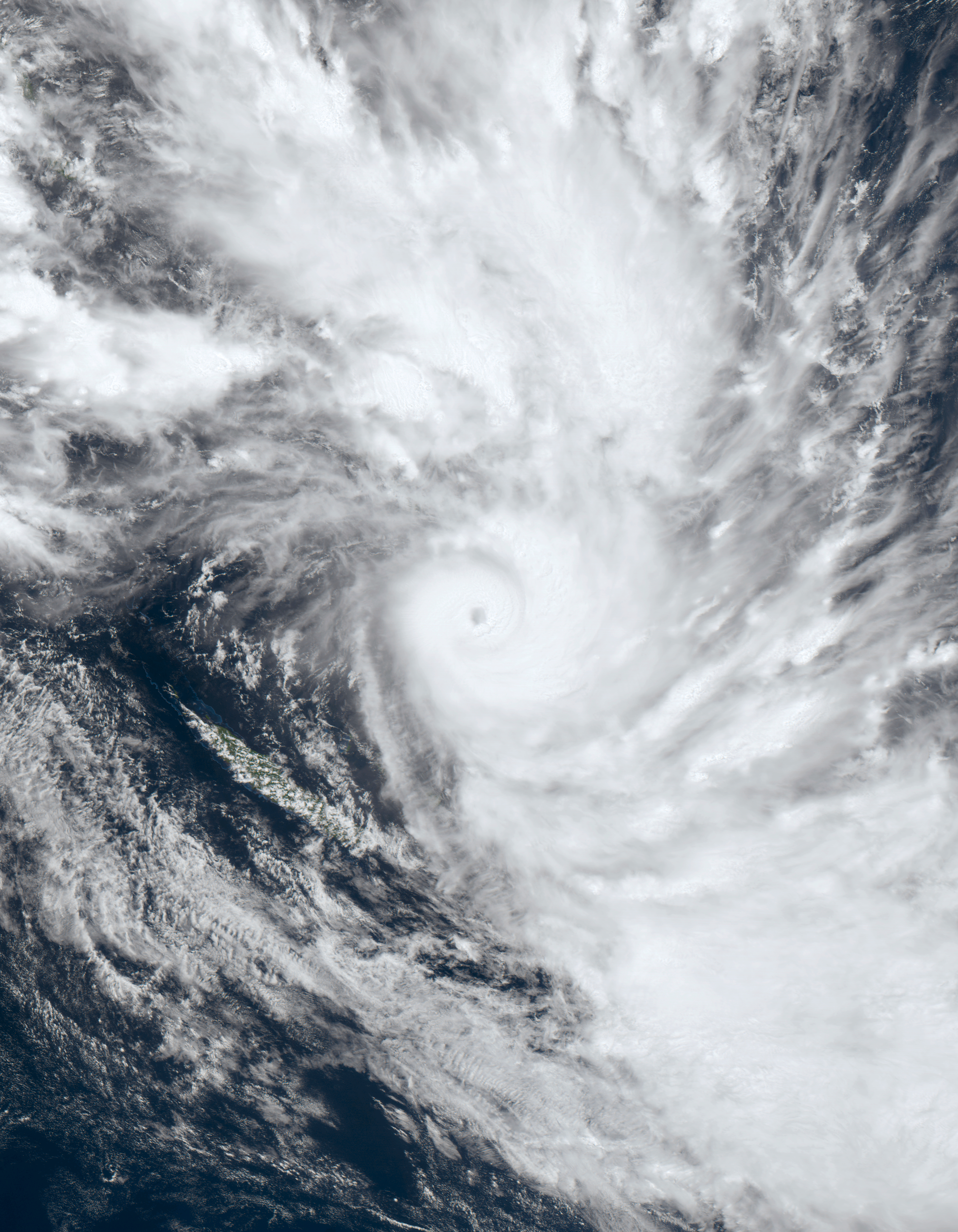
Cyclone Judy

Category 4 the second-highest classification on the Australian tropical cyclone intensity scale which is used to classify tropical cyclones, that have 10-minute sustained winds of at least wind speeds of 86–107 knots (159–198 km/h; 99–123 mph). As of 2019 47 tropical cyclones have peaked Category 4 severe tropical cyclones in the South Pacific tropical cyclone basin, which is denoted as the part of the Pacific Ocean to the south of the equator and to the east of 160°E. The earliest tropical cyclone to be classified as a Category 4 severe tropical cyclone was Gyan which was classified as a Category 4 during December 22, 1981, as it impacted New Caledonia. The latest was Pola as it passed between Fiji and Tonga. This list does include any tropical cyclones that peaked as a Category 5 severe tropical cyclone, while in the Southern Pacific tropical cyclone basin.

== Background ==
The South Pacific tropical cyclone basin is located to the south of the Equator between 160°E and 120°W. The basin is officially monitored by the Fiji Meteorological Service and the New Zealand MetService, while other meteorological services such as the Australian Bureau of Meteorology, Météo-France as well as the United States Joint Typhoon Warning Center also monitor the basin. Within the basin a Category 4 severe tropical cyclone is a tropical cyclone that has 10-minute mean maximum sustained wind speeds of 86–107 knots (159–198 km/h; 99–123 mph) on the Australian tropical cyclone intensity scale. A named storm could also be classified as a Category 4 tropical cyclone if it is estimated, to have 1-minute mean maximum sustained wind speeds of between 113–136 knots (209–252 km/h; 130–157 mph) on the Saffir–Simpson hurricane wind scale. This scale is only officially used in American Samoa, however, various agencies including NASA also use it to compare tropical cyclones. A Category 4 tropical cyclone is expected to cause catastrophic devastation, if it significantly impacts land at or near its peak intensity.

== Systems ==
Name	Duration	Peak intensity		Areas affected	Damage (USD)	Deaths	Refs
Name	Duration	Wind speed	Pressure	Areas affected	Damage (USD)	Deaths	Refs
Pam	January 30 – February 8, 1974	195 km/h (120 mph)	925 hPa (27.32 inHg)	Wallis and Futuna, Vanuatu; New Caledonia, Queensland	Significant	Unknown	
Gyan	December 18–29, 1981	185 km/h (115 mph)	925 hPa (27.32 inHg)	Vanuatu			
Abigail	February 2–3, 1982	175 km/h (110 mph)	947 hPa (27.96 inHg)				
Isaac	February 27 – March 5, 1982	175 km/h (110 mph)	930 hPa (27.46 inHg)	Tonga	10 million	6	
Bernie	April 5 – 9, 1982	165 km/h (105 mph)	960 hPa (28.35 inHg)				
Nisha; Orama	February 13–28, 1983	185 km/h (115 mph)	925 hPa (27.32 inHg)	French Polynesia	$1.7 million		
Oscar	February 28, 1983	185 km/h (115 mph)	920 hPa (27.17 inHg)	Fiji	$130 million	9	
Rewa	March 9–13, 1983	185 km/h (115 mph)	955 hPa (28.20 inHg)	French Polynesia		5	
Sarah	March 23 – April 4, 1983	165 km/h (105 mph)	940 hPa (27.76 inHg)	Fiji		None	
Tomasi	March 27 – April 5, 1983	185 km/h (115 mph)	955 hPa (28.20 inHg)	Cook Islands, Niue	Minor	None	
Veena	April 8–14, 1983	185 km/h (115 mph)	955 hPa (28.20 inHg)	French Polynesia		1	
Odette	January 19, 1985	165 km/h (105 mph)	936 hPa (27.64 inHg)	Vanuatu			
Ima	February 5–16, 1986	165 km/h (105 mph)	965 hPa (28.50 inHg)	Cook Islands			
Uma	February 4–8, 1987	165 km/h (105 mph)	940 hPa (27.76 inHg)	Vanuatu	$150 million	50	
Anne	January 5–14, 1988	185 km/h (115 mph)	925 hPa (27.32 inHg)	Vanuatu, New Caledonia	$500 000	2	
Bola	February 24 – March 4, 1988	175 km/h (110 mph)	940 hPa (27.76 inHg)	Vanuatu, Fiji, New Zealand	$87 million	3	
Harry	February 8–19, 1989	185 km/h (115 mph)	925 hPa (27.32 inHg)	New Caledonia			(Note: Harry peaked as a Category 4 severe tropical cyclone while in the South Pacific basin during February 13, before it peaked as a Category 5 severe tropical cyclone within the Australian region.)
Ofa	January 27 – February 10, 1990	185 km/h (115 mph)	925 hPa (27.32 inHg)	Polynesia	$187 million	8	
Val	December 4–17, 1991	165 km/h (105 mph)	940 hPa (27.76 inHg)	Tuvalu, Samoan Islands	$330 million	16	c
Wasa; Arthur	December 4–18, 1991	165 km/h (105 mph)	940 hPa (27.76 inHg)	French Polynesia	$60 million	2	
Betsy	January 4–15, 1992	165 km/h (105 mph)	940 hPa (27.76 inHg)	Vanuatu	$2 million	2	
Esau	February 24 – March 7, 1992	195 km/h (120 mph)	925 hPa (27.32 inHg)	Vanuatu	Minimal	1	
Joni	December 3–13, 1992	165 km/h (105 mph)	940 hPa (27.76 inHg)	Tuvalu, Fiji	$1.6 million	1	
Nina	21 December 1992 – 5 January 1993	150 km/h (90 mph)	960 hPa (28.35 inHg)	Queensland, Tonga, Papua New Guinea; Solomon Islands, Wallis and Futuna	$1 million	32	
Prema	March 26 – April 6, 1993	165 km/h (105 mph)	940 hPa (27.76 inHg)	Vanuatu, New Caledonia	$50 million	1	
Sarah	January 18 – February 4, 1994	165 km/h (105 mph)	945 hPa (27.91 inHg)				
Theodore	February 26 – March 3, 1994	185 km/h (115 mph)	933 hPa (27.55 inHg)				
Beti	March 21–28, 1996	165 km/h (105 mph)	935 hPa (27.61 inHg)	New Caledonia, Vanuatu; Australia, New Zealand	$5.3 million	2	
Drena	January 3–10, 1997	165 km/h (105 mph)	935 hPa (27.61 inHg)	Vanuatu, New Caledonia; New Zealand			
Gavin	March 3–12, 1997	185 km/h (115 mph)	925 hPa (27.32 inHg)	Tuvalu, Fiji; Wallis and Futuna	$18.3 million	18	
Dani	January 15–22, 1999	185 km/h (115 mph)	925 hPa (27.32 inHg)	Vanuatu, Fiji; New Caledonia	$2 million	14	
Kim	February 23–29, 2000	165 km/h (105 mph)	935 hPa (27.61 inHg)	French Polynesia	Minimal	None	
Paula	February 26 – March 4, 2001	175 km/h (110 mph)	930 hPa (27.46 inHg)	Vanuatu, Fiji, Tonga	$1.39 million	2	
Waka	December 19, 2001 – January 2, 2002	175 km/h (110 mph)	930 hPa (27.46 inHg)	Wallis and Futuna, Tonga	$51.3 million	1	
Eseta	March 10–14, 2003	185 km/h (115 mph)	930 hPa (27.46 inHg)	Fiji	$876,239	None	
Ivy	February 21 – March 2, 2004	165 km/h (105 mph)	935 hPa (27.61 inHg)	Vanuatu	$8 million	2	
Nancy	February 10–17, 2005	175 km/h (110 mph)	930 hPa (27.46 inHg)	Cook Islands	Severe	None	
Xavier	October 20–26, 2006	175 km/h (110 mph)	930 hPa (27.46 inHg)	Solomon Islands, Vanuatu	Extensive	None	
Daman	December 2–10, 2008	185 km/h (115 mph)	925 hPa (27.32 inHg)	Fiji, Tonga	$330 000	None	
Funa	January 14–21, 2008	175 km/h (110 mph)	930 hPa (27.46 inHg)	Vanuatu	Severe	None	
Oli	January 29 – February 7, 2010	185 km/h (115 mph)	925 hPa (27.32 inHg)	Cook Islands, French Polynesia	$70 million	1	
Tomas	March 9 – 17, 2010	185 km/h (115 mph)	925 hPa (27.32 inHg)	Wallis and Futuna, Fiji	$45 million	3	
Zelia	12 – 18 January 2011	185 km/h (115 mph)	943 hPa (27.85 inHg)	Norfolk Island, New Zealand	None	None	
Wilma	January 19 – 28, 2011	185 km/h (115 mph)	935 hPa (27.61 inHg)	Samoan Islands, Tonga; New Zealand	$22 million	3	
Atu	February 13 – 24, 2011	165 km/h (105 mph)	937 hPa (27.67 inHg)	New Caledonia, Vanuatu			
Jasmine	February 6 – 19, 2012	195 km/h (120 mph)	937 hPa (27.67 inHg)	Solomon Islands, Vanuatu; New Caledonia, Tonga	None	None	
Evan	December 9 – 19, 2012	185 km/h (115 mph)	943 hPa (27.85 inHg)	Samoan Islands, Fiji; Wallis and Futuna	$161 million	4	
Freda	December 26, 2012 – January 4, 2013	185 km/h (115 mph)	940 hPa (27.76 inHg)	Solomon Islands; New Caledonia	Unknown	2	
Sandra	March 9 – 14, 2013	185 km/h (115 mph)	930 hPa (27.46 inHg)	New Caledonia, New Zealand	None	None	
Ula	December 26, 2015 – January 12, 2016	185 km/h (115 mph)	945 hPa (27.91 inHg)	Tuvalu, Samoan Islands, Tonga; Fiji, Vanuatu, New Caledonia	Unknown	1	
Hola	March 3 – 11, 2018	165 km/h (105 mph)	952 hPa (28.11 inHg)	Fiji, Vanuatu; New Caledonia, New Zealand	Unknown	3	
Pola	February 23 – March 2, 2019	165 km/h (105 mph)	950 hPa (28.05 inHg)	Wallis and Futuna, Fiji, Tonga	Unknown	Unknown	
Dovi	February 6 – 12, 2022	175 km/h (110 mph)	940 hPa (27.76 inHg)	Vanuatu, New Caledonia, New Zealand	$80 million	1	
Judy	February 23 – March 4, 2023	175 km/h (110 mph)	945 hPa (27.91 inHg)	Vanuatu	Unknown	Unknown	

== Other systems ==
The FMS considers Gabrielle to have peaked as a Category 4 severe tropical cyclone in the Australian region and weakened into a Category 3 severe tropical cyclone as it moved into its area of responsibility.

In addition to the 47 tropical cyclones listed above Severe Tropical Cyclone's: Kerry, Katrina, Larry and Jasper, were considered by the BoM to be Category 4 Severe tropical cyclones within the South Pacific Ocean, after they had moved into the Australian region. The BoM also considers Severe Tropical Cyclone Watorea, to have been a Category 5 severe tropical cyclone, within the Australian region before it moved into the basin during February 24. Severe Tropical Cyclone Anne was estimated to have peaked by the JTWC, with one-minute sustained wind speeds of 260 km/h (160 mph) for six hours during January 11, 1988. This made it equivalent to a Category 5 tropical cyclone on the SSHWS, however, the FMS estimated that the system had peaked with 10-minute sustained winds of 185 km/h (115 mph) based on the Dvorak technique, which made it a Category 4 severe tropical cyclone on the Australian scale. During 2017, a study into Category 4 and 5 tropical cyclones over the South Pacific during the 1980s, was published within the Royal Meteorological Society's International Journal of Climatology. This showed that the intensity of such tropical cyclones had been underestimated by the various warning centres during the decade. In particular, they estimated that Severe Tropical Cyclone's Oscar and Nisha-Orama had 1-minute sustained winds of 285 km/h (175 mph), which would make them Category 5 tropical cyclones on the SSHWS.

== See also ==
- List of Category 4 Atlantic hurricanes
- List of Category 4 Pacific hurricanes
