= Cyclone Oscar =

South Pacific cyclone in 1983

Severe Tropical Cyclone Oscar
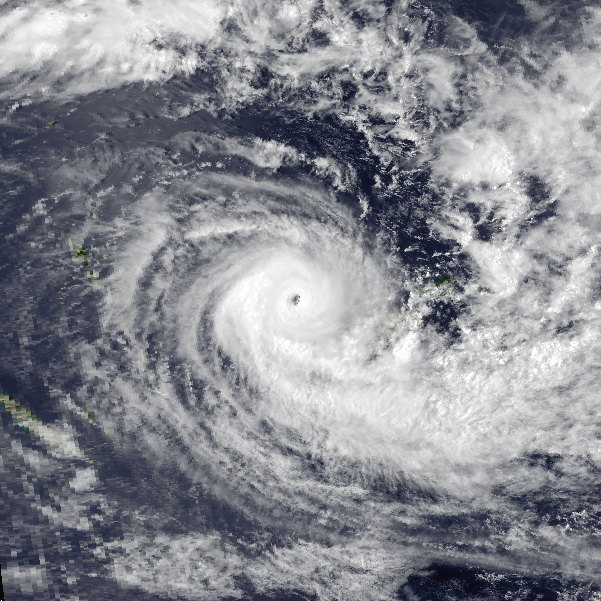
- Cyclone Oscar west of Fiji on 28 February

Meteorological history
- Formed: 23 February 1983
- Dissipated: 6 March 1983

Category 4 severe tropical cyclone
- 10-minute sustained (FMS)
- Highest winds: 185 km/h (115 mph)

Category 5 severe tropical cyclone
- 10-minute sustained (MetService)
- Highest winds: 205 km/h (125 mph)
- Lowest pressure: 920 hPa (mbar); 27.17 inHg

Category 3-equivalent tropical cyclone
- 1-minute sustained (SSHWS/JTWC)
- Highest winds: 185 km/h (115 mph)
- Lowest pressure: 943 hPa (mbar); 27.85 inHg

Overall effects
- Fatalities: 9 total
- Damage: $13 million (1983 USD)
- Areas affected: Fiji
- IBTrACS
- Part of the 1982–83 South Pacific cyclone season

Severe Tropical Cyclone Oscar was one of the worst tropical cyclones to affect Fiji. The system was first noted as a shallow depression on 23 February, while it was located to the north of Fiji's capital Suva. The system subsequently developed further as it moved westwards and was named Oscar the next day. Oscar subsequently intensified as it moved westwards and gradually developed further on 27 February. The system subsequently turned and started to move south-eastwards towards Fiji.

== Meteorological history ==
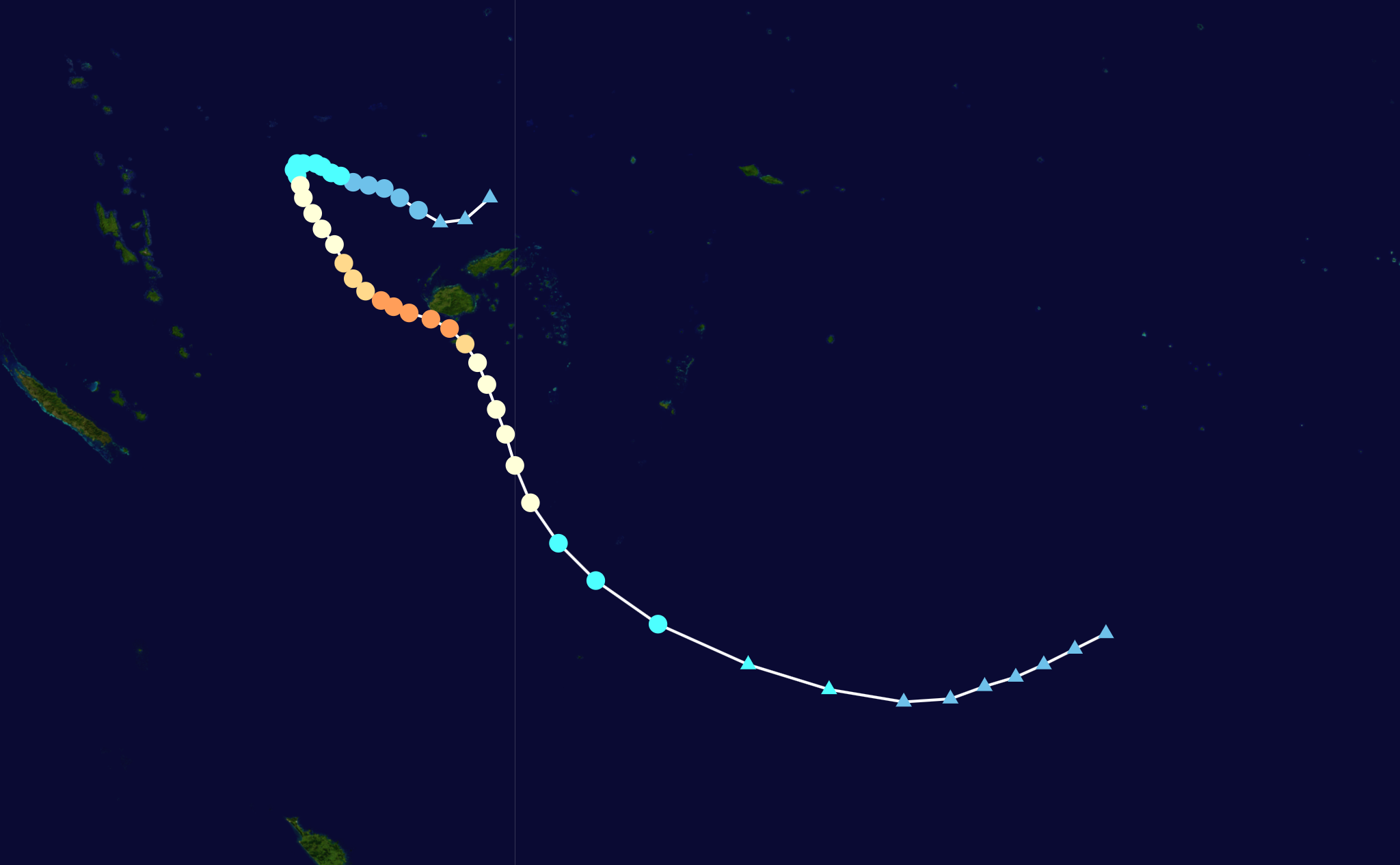
Map plotting the storm's track and intensity, according to the Saffir–Simpson scale Map key Saffir–Simpson scale Tropical depression (≤38 mph, ≤62 km/h) Tropical storm (39–73 mph, 63–118 km/h) Category 1 (74–95 mph, 119–153 km/h) Category 2 (96–110 mph, 154–177 km/h) Category 3 (111–129 mph, 178–208 km/h) Category 4 (130–156 mph, 209–251 km/h) Category 5 (≥157 mph, ≥252 km/h) Unknown Storm type Tropical cyclone Subtropical cyclone Extratropical cyclone, remnant low, tropical disturbance, or monsoon depression

On 23 February, the Fiji Meteorological Service (FMS) started to monitor a shallow depression, that had developed to the south of Rotuma. Over the next day, the system gradually developed further as it moved westwards, before it was classified it as a tropical cyclone and named it Oscar at about 16:00 UTC on 24 February (04:00 FST, 25 February). Over the next couple of days, Oscar gradually intensified as it moved north-westwards away from Fiji, before it turned and started to move south-eastwards towards the island nation during 26 February. Over the next day, the system developed hurricane-force winds as it continued to intensify and move south-eastwards, while an eye feature emerged on satellite imagery. At about 20:00 UTC on 27 February (08:00 FST, 28 February), the FMS issued a tropical cyclone alert to government authorities and the media, which advised that Oscar was located about 300 km (185 mi) to the north of Nadi and might impact Fiji within 24 hours.

On 28 February, the system continued to intensify as it came within range of the FMS's radar in Nadi, which showed that Oscar had an concentric eye. Later that day, the FMS reported that Oscar had peaked in intensity with 10-minute sustained wind speeds of 185 km/h (115 mph), which made it a Category 4 severe tropical cyclone on the modern day Australian tropical cyclone intensity scale. After the system had peaked, Oscar started to gradually weaken, as it moved closer to the Fijian island of Viti Levu than had previously been expected. At around 05:30 UTC (17:30 FST) on March 1, the FMS decided to secure its radar and satellite equipment, which meant that they were no longer able to monitor Oscar and passed its responsibilities to the New Zealand Meteorological Service. Hurricane-force winds were subsequently experienced in parts of Viti Levu, before the system ultimately passed about 30 km (15 mi) to the south of Sigatoka. At around 22:00 UTC (10:00 FST, 2 March), Oscar passed near or over Kadavu Island, where sustained winds dropped from a peak of 150 km/h (90 mph) to 20 km/h (10 mph). After the system cleared Kandavu, it appeared to rapidly weaken, before its remnants were last noted on 6 March, while it was located about 800 km (495 mi) to the south of Rarotonga in the Cook Islands.

=== Intensity estimates ===
Data submitted to the International Best Track Archive for Climate Stewardship (IBTRACS) by New Zealand's MetService shows that Oscar peaked with 10-minute sustained wind speeds of 200 km/h (130 mph) and a minimum pressure of 920 hPa (27.17 inHg), which would make it a Category 5 severe tropical cyclone. IBTRACS also shows that the United States Joint Typhoon Warning Center (JTWC) which operationaly monitored Oscar as Tropical Cyclone 14P, estimated that the system had peaked with 1-minute sustained wind speeds of 185 km/h (115 mph), which made it a Category 3 hurricane on the Saffir–Simpson hurricane wind scale (SSHWS). Other notable intensity estimates include those by Charles J. Neumann, whose dataset also estimates that Oscar peaked as a Category 3 hurricane on the SSHWS, with 1-minute sustained wind speeds of 195 km/h (120 mph) and a minimum pressure of 943 hPa (27.8 inHg). A study into extreme tropical cyclone activity in the southern Pacific Ocean, published in the Royal Meteorological Society's International Journal of Climatology in 2017, shows that Oscar had peaked with 1-minute sustained wind speeds of 280 km/h (175 mph) which would make it a Category 5 hurricane on the SSHWS.

== Preparations and impact ==
Cyclone Oscar affected Fiji between 28 February and 2 March, and was responsible for nine deaths and US$130 million in damages. As a result of the storm's impact, the name Oscar was retired from the list of tropical cyclone names for the region. Ahead of a tropical cyclone alert for Fiji being issued on 27 February, local radio bulletins made Fijians aware that a tropical cyclone existed several days in advance. Gale, storm and hurricane warnings were subsequently issued for various parts of Fiji including Viti Levu, Kandavu and the Yasawa and Mamanutha island groups. Ahead of the system impacting the island nation, the Nadi International Airport was closed, with both internal and external flights cancelled. Schools around the nation were also closed with some being used as evacuation centres for the hundreds of Fijians who evacuated. On 28 February, the system started to affect Fiji with strong winds and light rain, before the wind and rain gradually became stronger the following day, with storm and hurricane-force winds recorded over the island nation.

Damage was mostly in the form of severe flooding from storm tides and torrential rains. Hardest hit areas included the Mamanutha Group, western and southwestern Viti Levu, and Yanutha, Vatulele, Kandevu and Mbengga Islands. In some areas storm surges reached nine to twelve feet (2.7 to 3.7 m). However, the highest measured storm surge value was 5.93 m (19.46 ft) at Rarawai Mill. Flooding due to torrential rains was particularly severe in western and southwestern Viti Levu. At Nadi Market flood levels were about 12 ft above the asphalt pavement. In the Singatoka Valley, which supplies most of Fiji's vegetables, most crops were destroyed as flooding reached levels beyond living memory of most people.

=== Warnings ===
At 20:00 UTC on 27 February (08:00 FST, 28 February), the FMS issued a tropical cyclone alert to the media and government authorities, which warned that Oscar could cause gale or storm force winds in Western Viti Levu, Vatulele, Kadavu as well as the Yasawa and Mamanuca islands within the next 24 hours if it continued to move south-eastwards.

== Aftermath ==
On 1 March, after the system had moved through the archipelago, the Fijian government immediately declared a national disaster and asked for assistance from the international community. Efforts to clean up certain towns including Nadi, Lautoka, Sigatoka and Suva started almost immediately after Oscar had moved away, with the Sigatoka Town council initiating a spraying campaign to destroy mosquitoes and counter an outbreak of disease.
