= List of storms named Javier =

The name Javier has been used for seven tropical cyclones in the Eastern Pacific Ocean.

- Hurricane Javier (1980) – stayed in the open ocean.
- Hurricane Javier (1986) – produced high waves in southern California.
- Hurricane Javier (1992) – dissipated south of Hawaii.
- Tropical Storm Javier (1998) – made landfall in southwestern Mexico, dissipated shortly after moving ashore.
- Hurricane Javier (2004) – made landfall in Baja California; later produced rainfall across the southwest United States.
- Tropical Storm Javier (2016) – struck Baja California, degenerated into a remnant low shortly after passing offshore.
- Tropical Storm Javier (2022) – formed near Baja California but did not make landfall, dissipated shortly after.

== See also ==
- Tropical Storm Xavier – a similar name which is also included in the Eastern Pacific lists.
