= 1973–74 South-West Indian Ocean cyclone season =

Cyclone season in the Southwest Indian Ocean

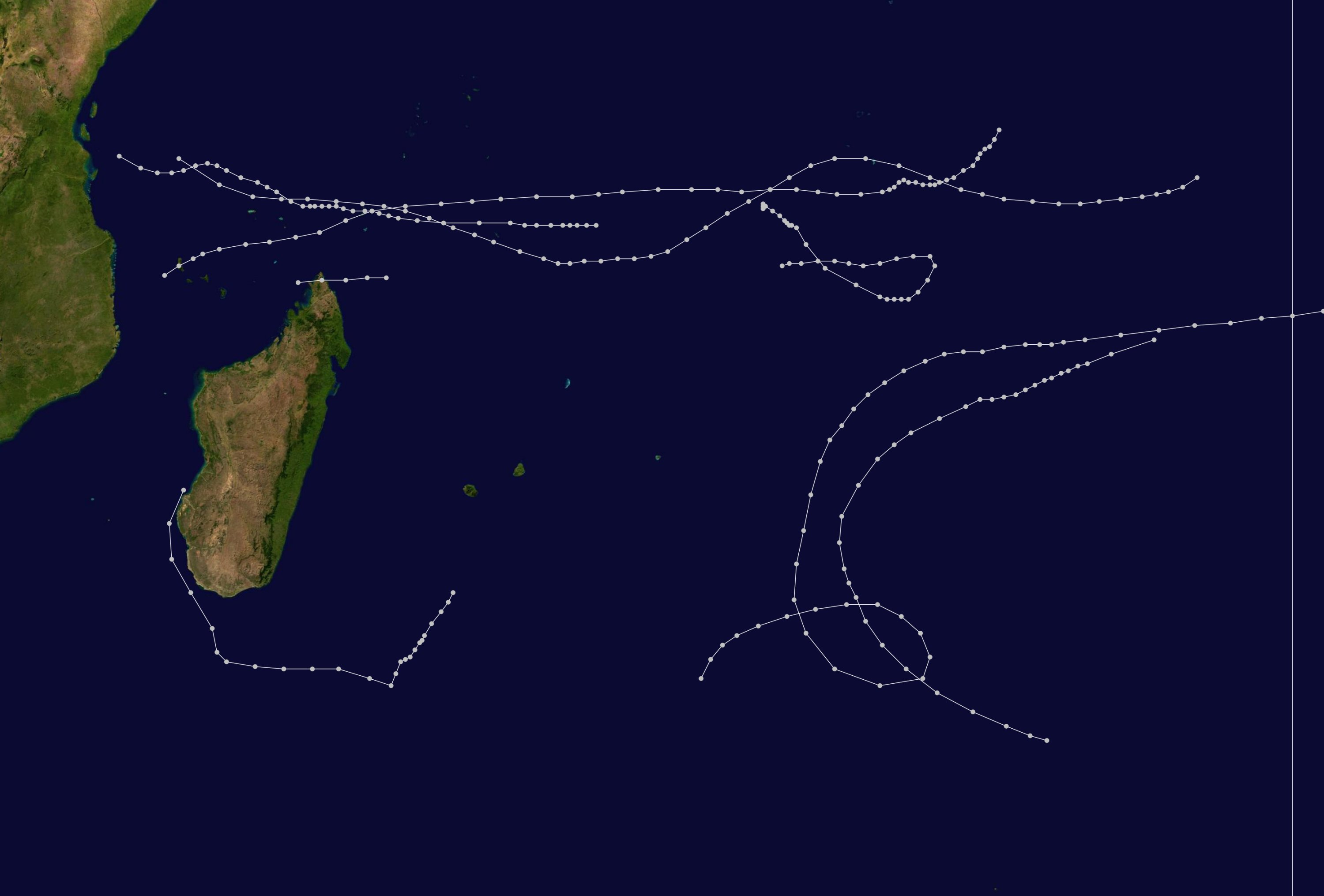
- Season summary map

Seasonal boundaries
- First system formed: 14 September 1973
- Last system dissipated: 23 April 1974

Strongest storm
- Name: Deidre-Delinda
  - Maximum winds: 150 km/h (90 mph) (10-minute sustained)
  - Lowest pressure: 964 hPa (mbar)

Seasonal statistics
- Total disturbances: 8
- Total depressions: 7
- Total storms: 7
- Tropical cyclones: 2
- Intense tropical cyclones: 1
- Total fatalities: Unknown
- Total damage: Unknown

Related articles
- 1973–74 Australian region cyclone season; 1973–74 South Pacific cyclone season

The 1973–74 South-West Indian Ocean cyclone season was a below-average cyclone season. The season officially ran from November 1, 1973, to April 30, 1974.

== Systems ==
=== Moderate Tropical Storm Alice ===
- Moderate tropical storm (MFR)
- Tropical storm (SSHWS)
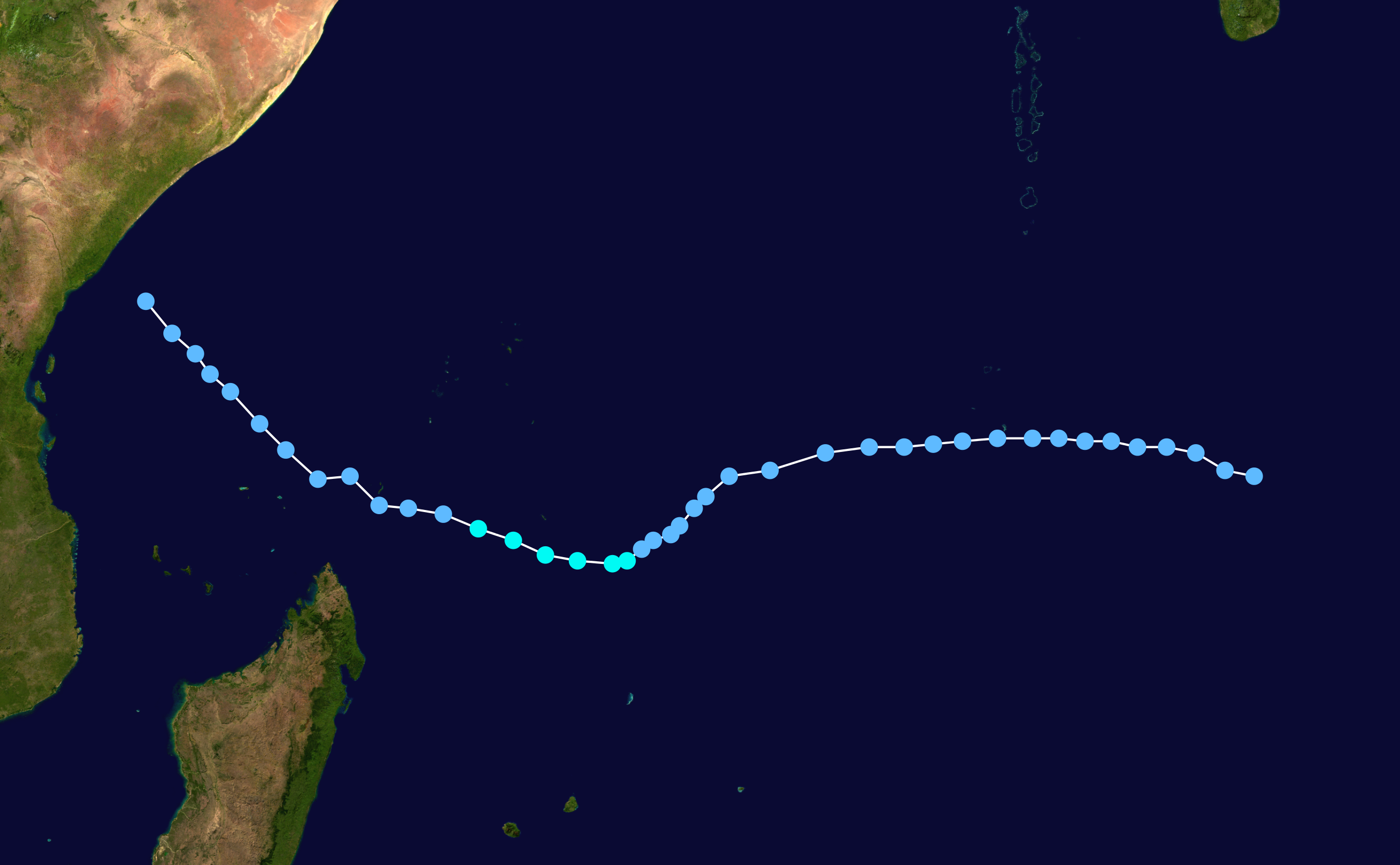
- Duration: September 14 – September 24
- Peak intensity: 75 km/h (45 mph) (10-min); 1000 hPa (mbar)

Alice was born around 80E, and reached its greatest intensity (Phase C plus) on September 20 to the north of Tromelin. but has resulted in some light to moderate rain over extreme northeastern Madagascar between 21 and 23, the winds not exceeding 55 km / h in the region of Diego-Suarez.

=== Tropical Cyclone Bernadette ===
- Tropical cyclone (MFR)
- Tropical storm (SSHWS)
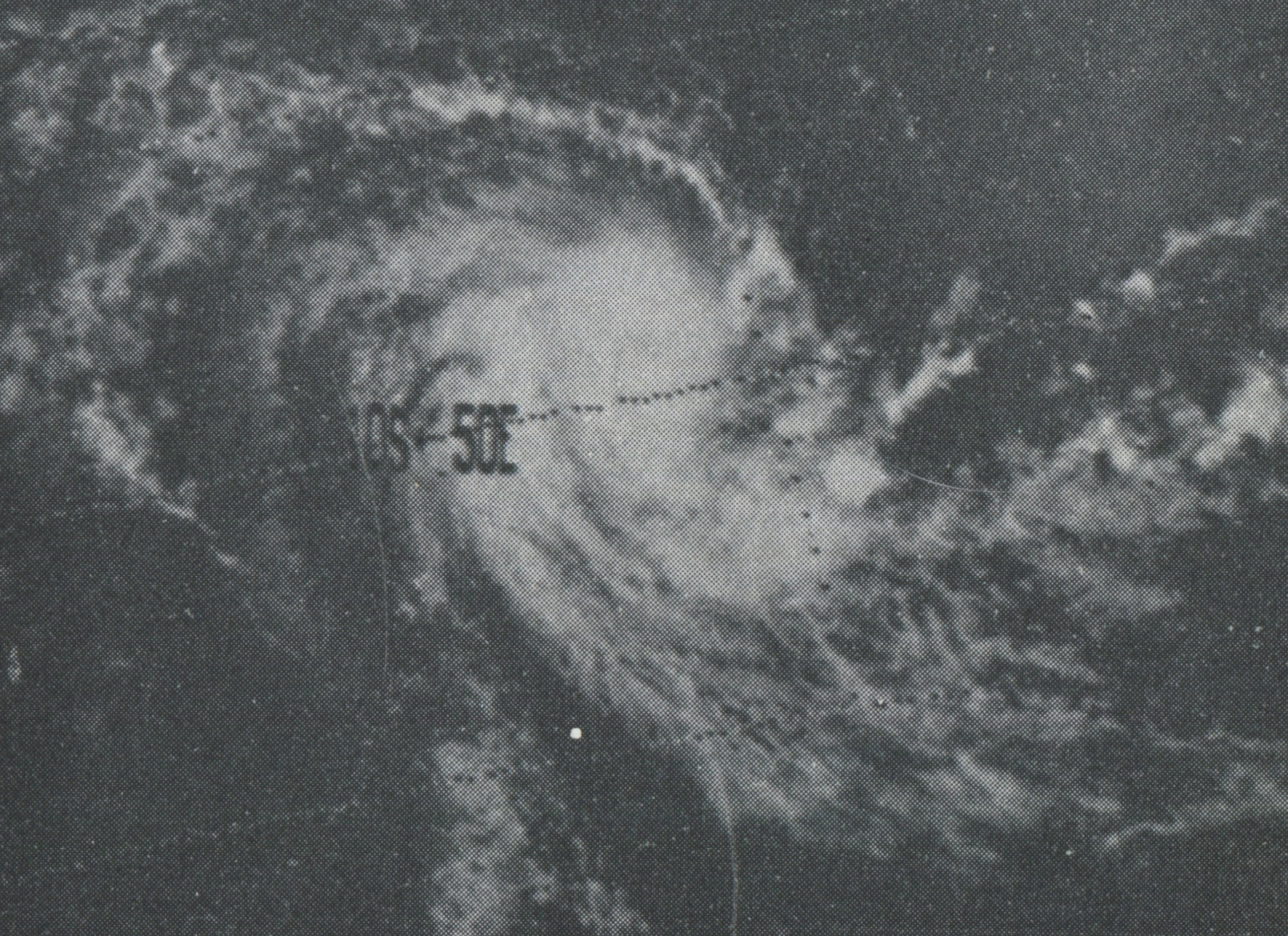
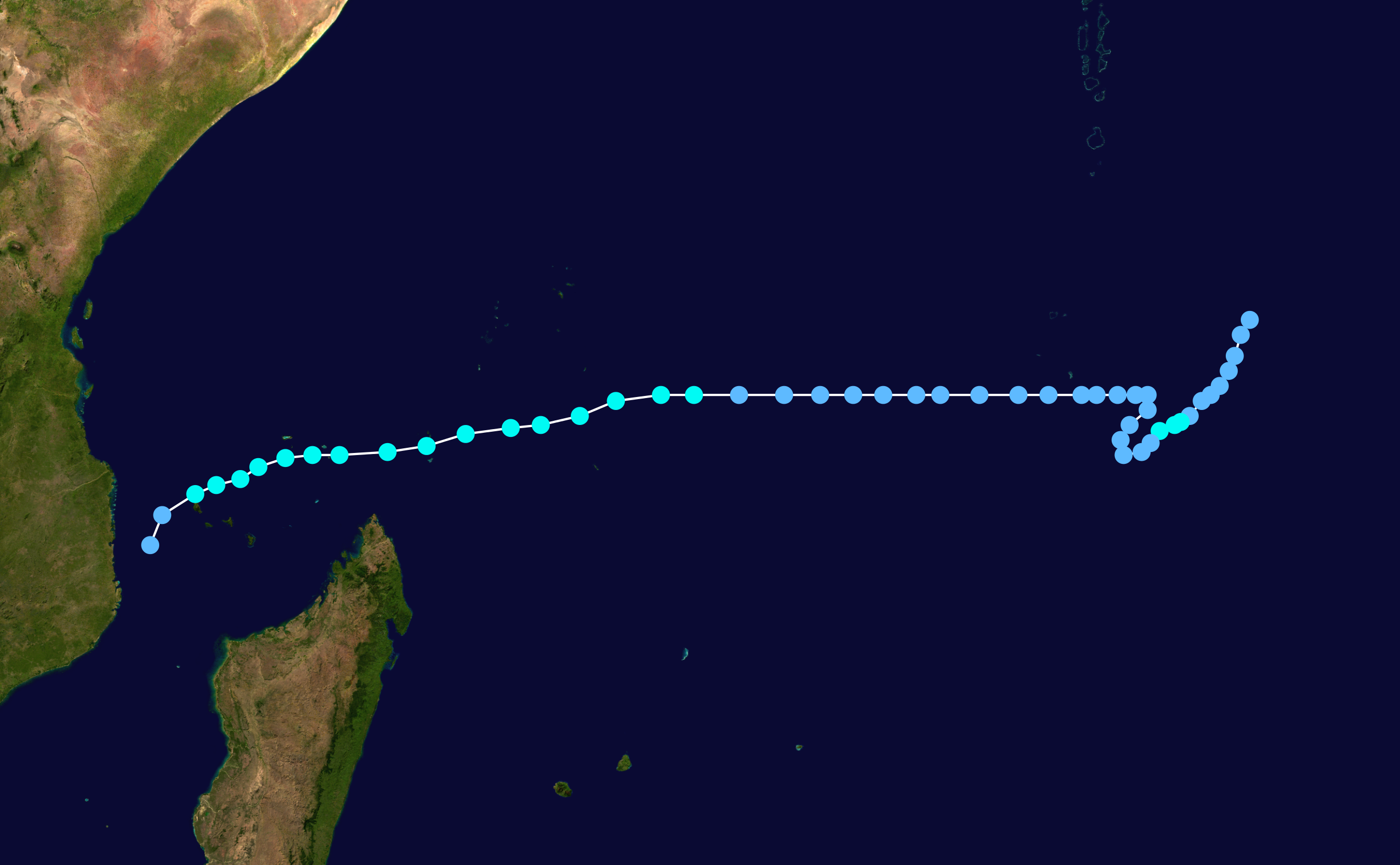
- Duration: October 16 – October 28
- Peak intensity: 150 km/h (90 mph) (10-min); 985 hPa (mbar)

Bernadette, more active than before, has reached the stage of a tropical cyclone in the strict sense of the international classification, in the 26th October (minimum pressure estimated of 985 mb), moderate rainfall strong enough of have been recorded on the extreme north of Madagascar and off the cape of Amber, a boat noted a peak wind of 139 km/h.

=== Moderate Tropical Storm Christiane ===
- Moderate tropical storm (MFR)
- Tropical storm (SSHWS)
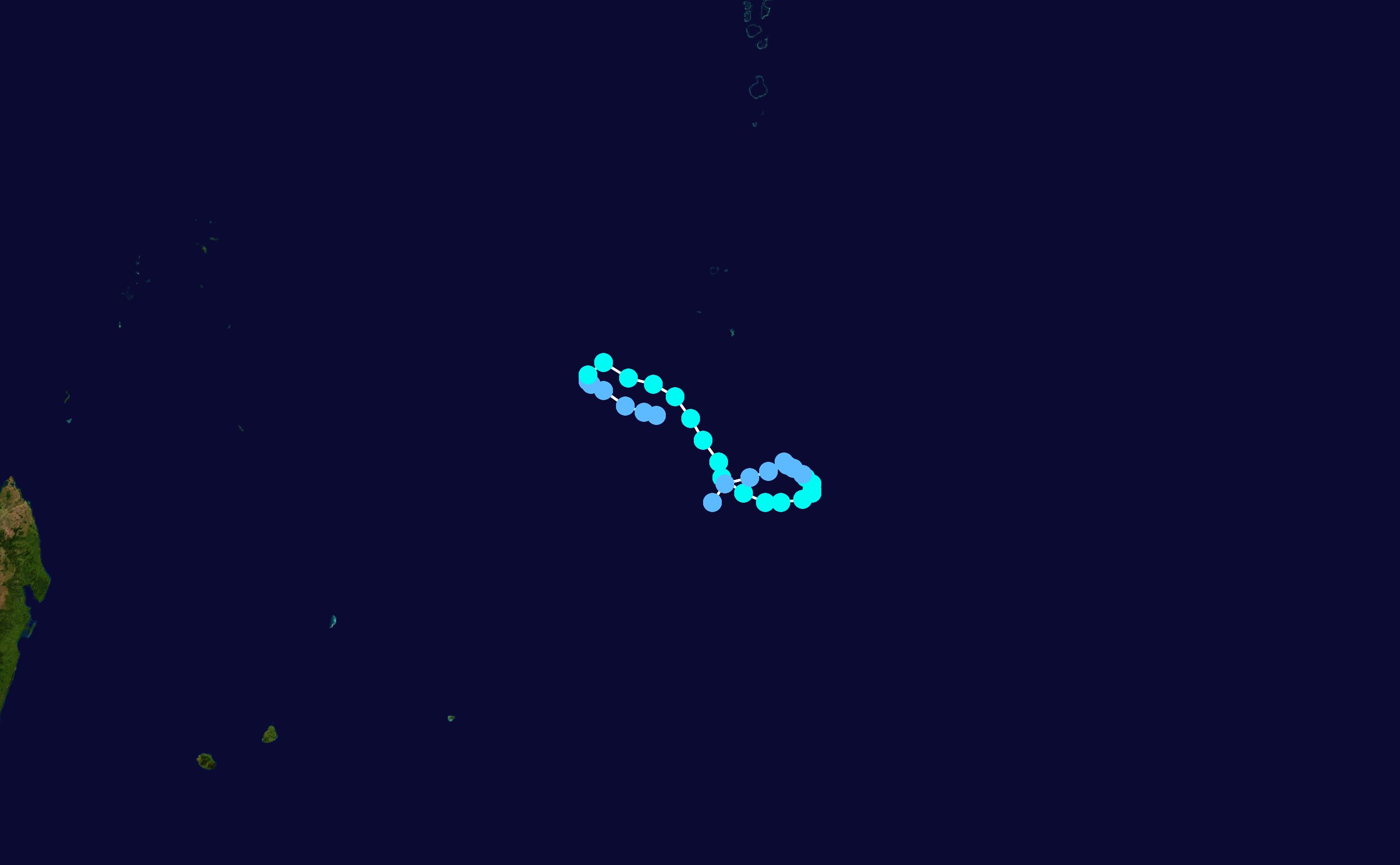
- Duration: December 13 – December 21
- Peak intensity: 75 km/h (45 mph) (10-min); 995 hPa (mbar)

Moderate Tropical Storm Christian existed from December 13 to December 21.

=== Intense Tropical Cyclone Deidre–Delinda ===
- Intense tropical cyclone (MFR)
- Category 2 tropical cyclone (SSHWS)
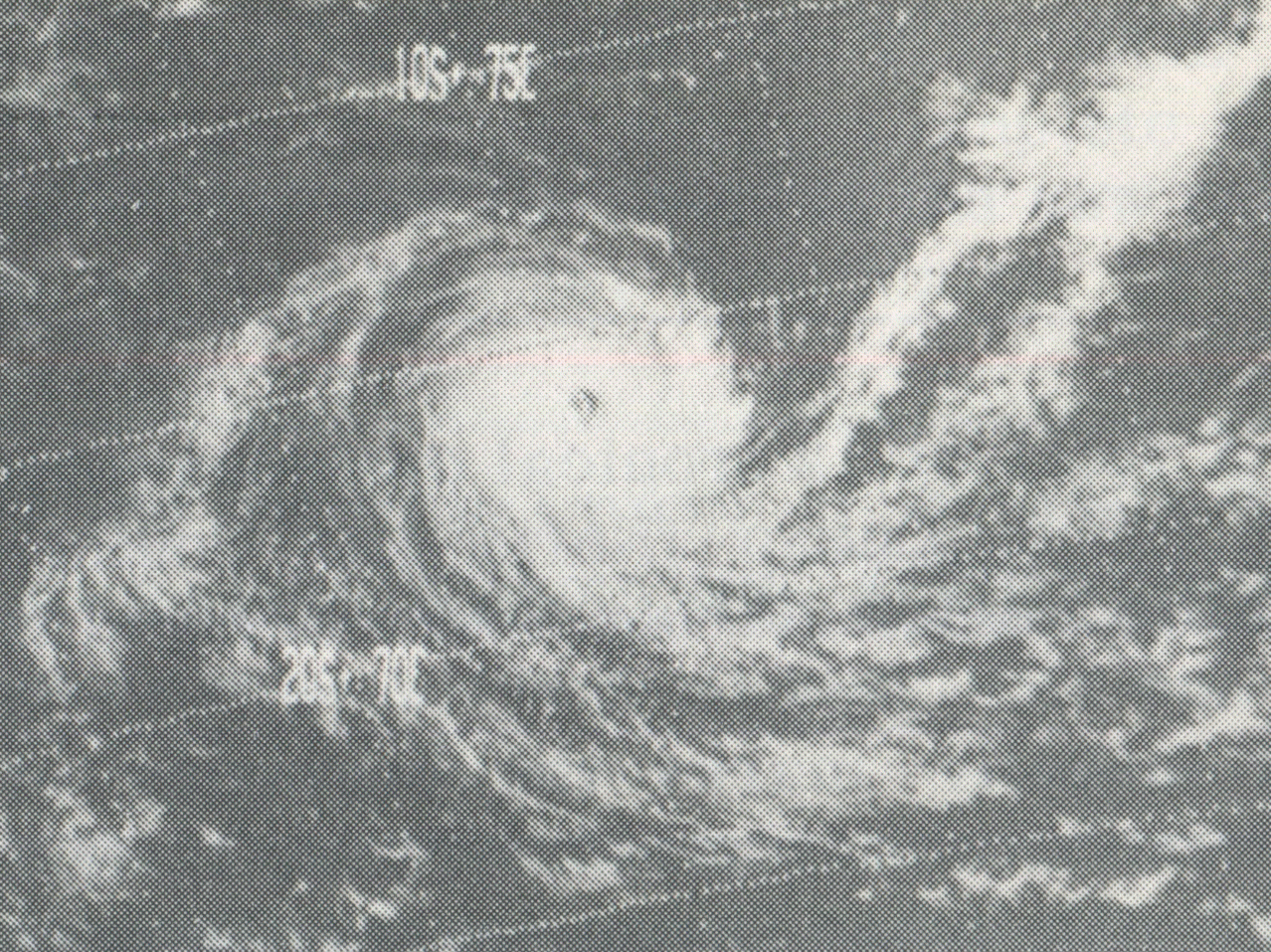
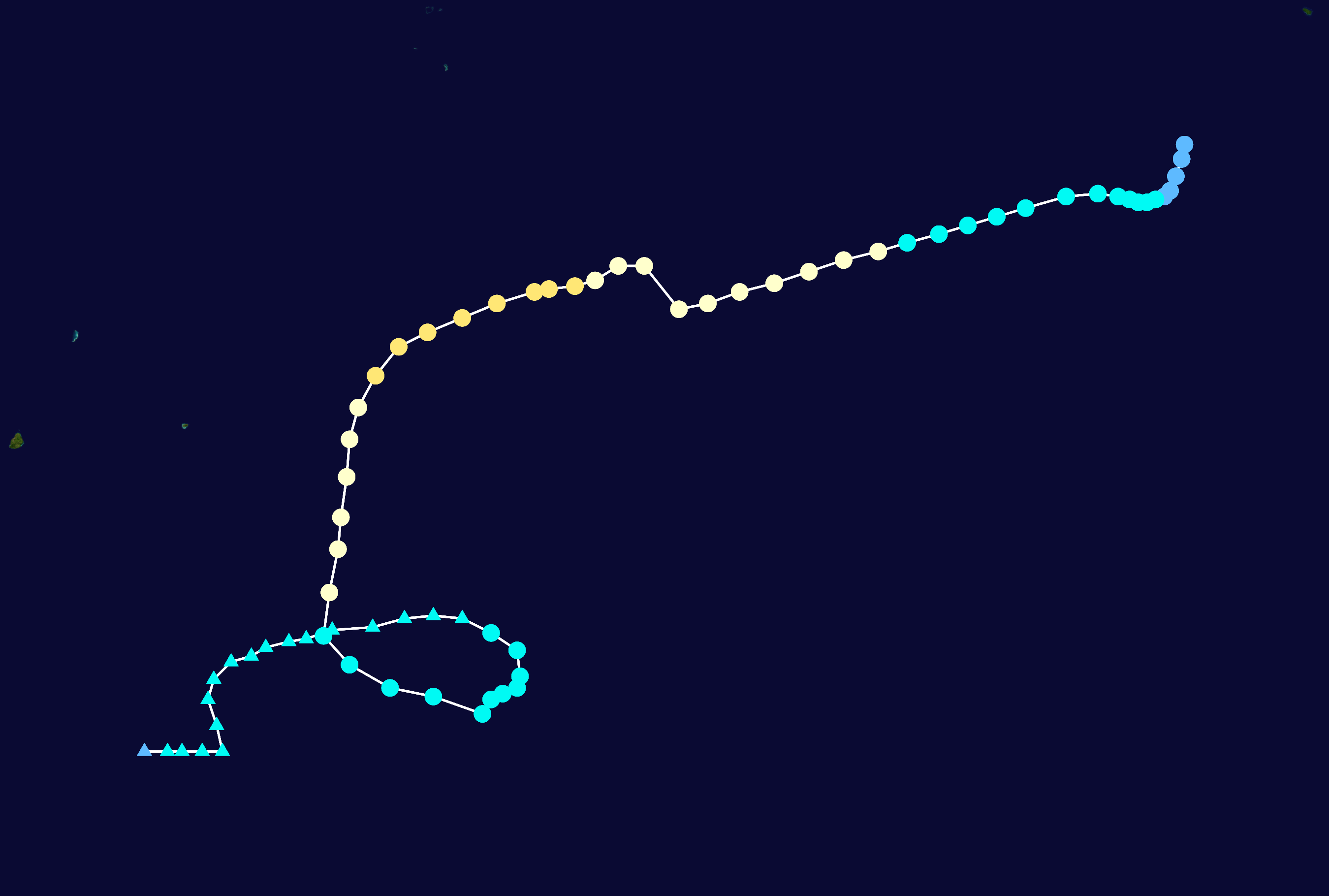
- Duration: December 26 (Crossed 80°E) – January 4
- Peak intensity: 205 km/h (125 mph) (10-min); 965 hPa (mbar)

Tropical Cyclone Deidre-Delinda existed from December 26, 1973, to January 4, 1974.

=== Moderate Tropical Storm Esmeralda ===
- Moderate tropical storm (MFR)
- Tropical storm (SSHWS)
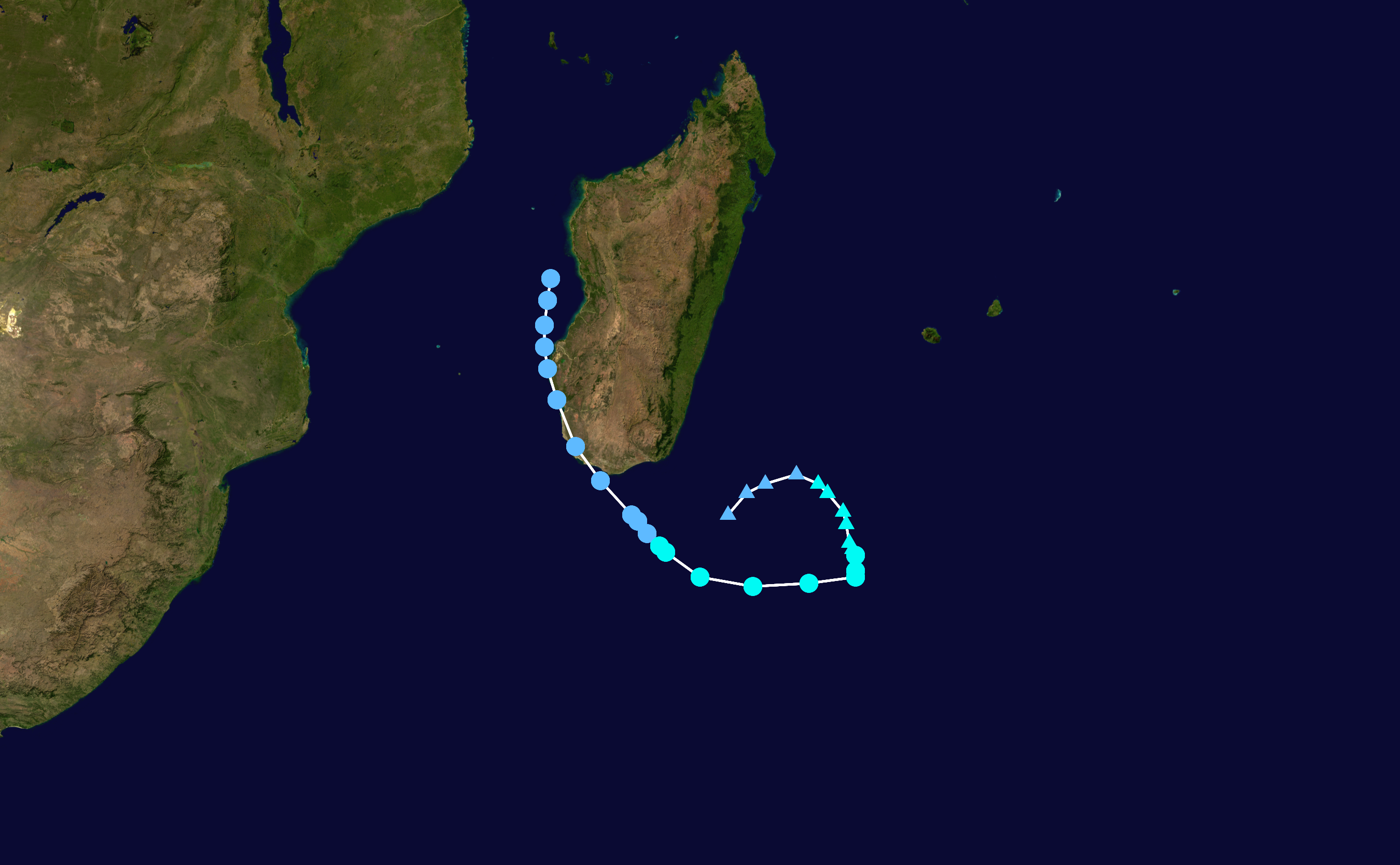
- Duration: December 30 – January 5
- Peak intensity: 85 km/h (50 mph) (10-min); 995 hPa (mbar)

Moderate Tropical Storm Esmeralda existed from December 30, 1973, to January 5, 1974. The storm looped to the southeast of Madagascar, bringing several days of rainfall to Réunion, reaching 222.2 mm (8.75 in).

=== Tropical Disturbance Fredegonde ===
- Tropical disturbance (MFR)
- Tropical depression (SSHWS)
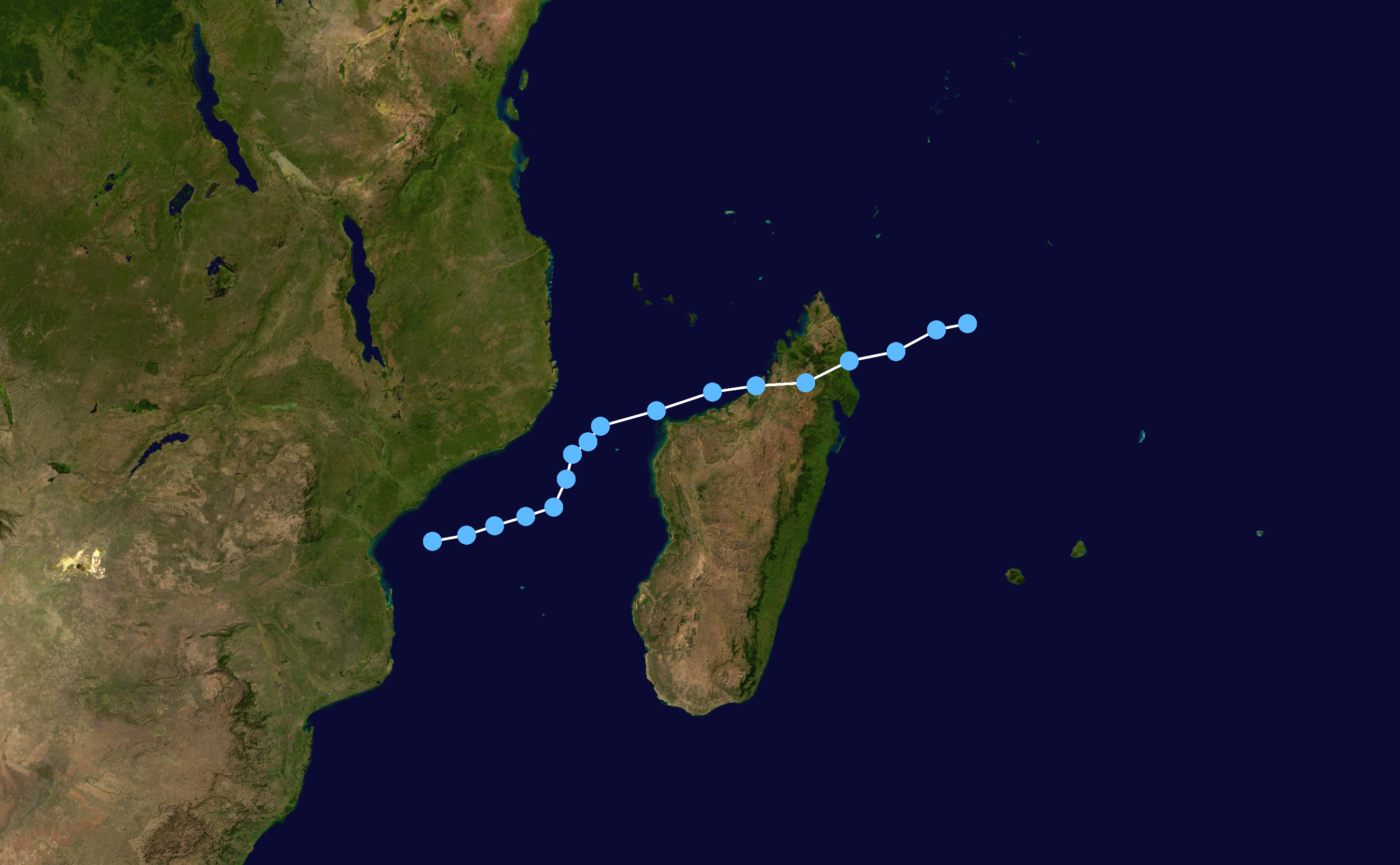
- Duration: January 19 – January 23
- Peak intensity: 45 km/h (30 mph) (10-min); 1005 hPa (mbar)

Tropical Disturbance Fredegonde existed from January 19 to January 23.

=== Tropical Cyclone Ghislaine ===
- Tropical cyclone (MFR)
- Tropical storm (SSHWS)
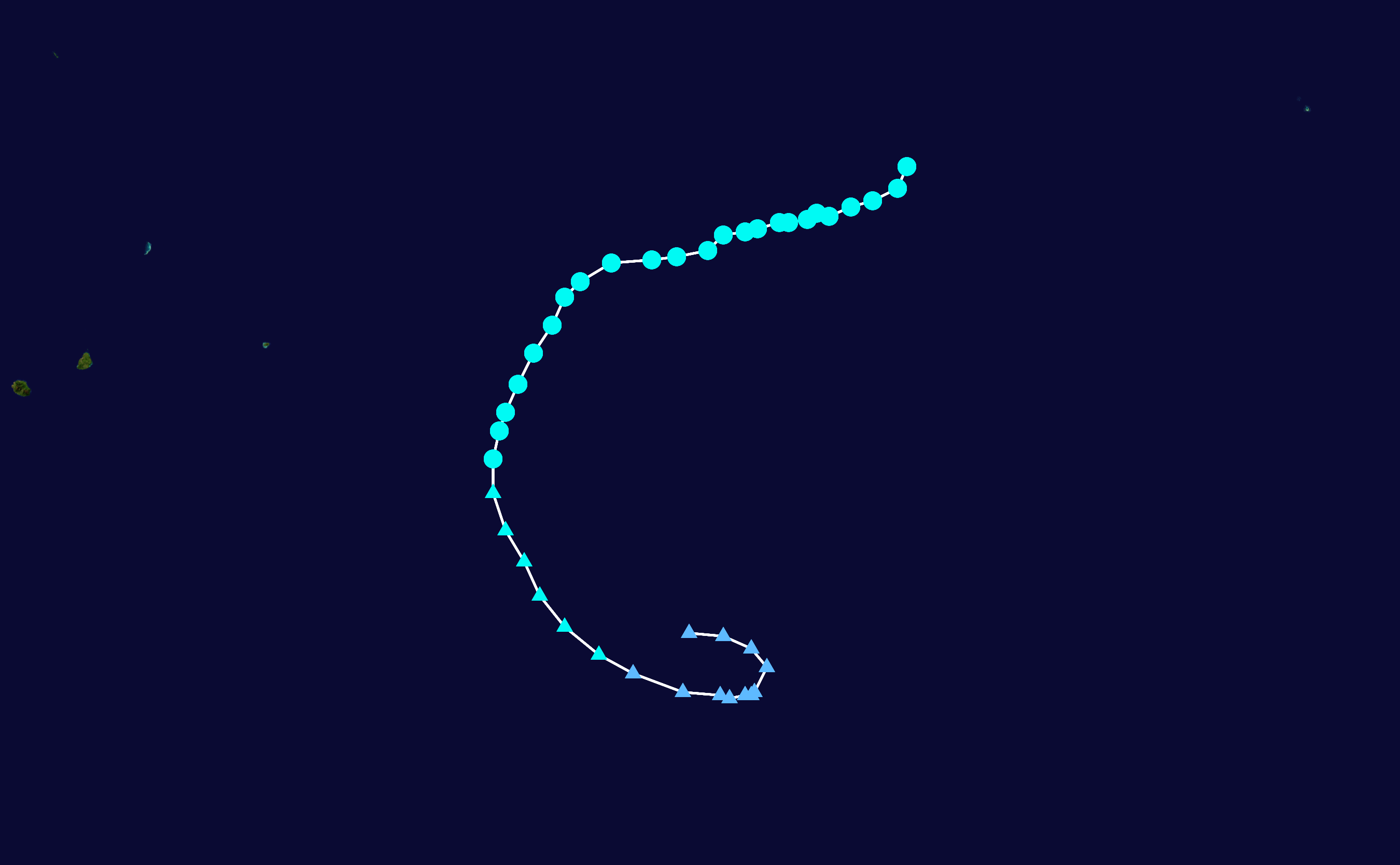
- Duration: February 24 (Crossed 80°E) – March 3
- Peak intensity: 150 km/h (90 mph) (10-min); 985 hPa (mbar)

Moderate Tropical Storm Ghislaine existed from February 24 to March 3.

=== Severe Tropical Storm Honorine ===
- Severe tropical storm (MFR)
- Tropical storm (SSHWS)
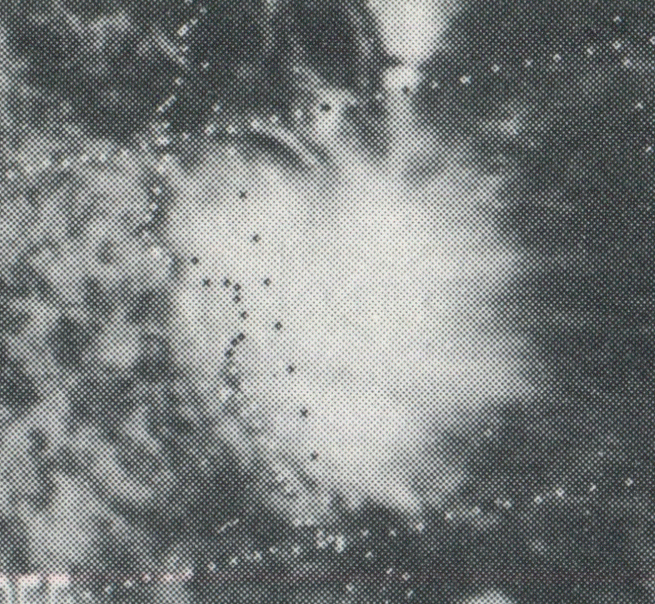
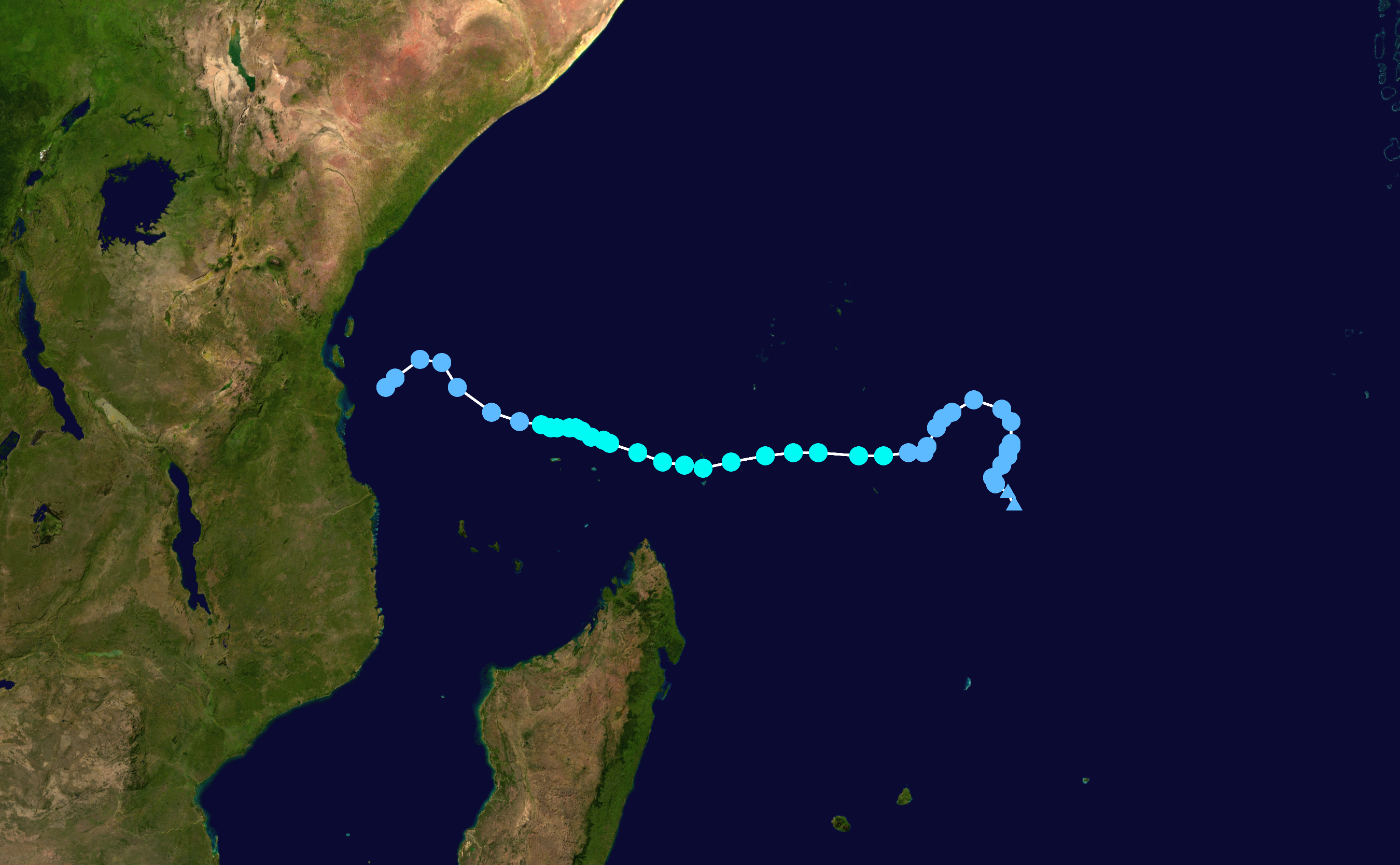
- Duration: April 12 – April 23
- Peak intensity: 95 km/h (60 mph) (10-min); 998 hPa (mbar)

Moderate Tropical Storm Honorine existed from April 12 to April 23.

== Season effects ==
Name	Dates	Peak intensity			Areas affected	Damage (USD)	Deaths	Refs
Name	Dates	Category	Wind speed	Pressure	Areas affected	Damage (USD)	Deaths	Refs
Alice	September 14 – 24, 1973	Moderate tropical storm	75 km/h (45 mph)	1000 hPa (29.53 inHg)	Madagascar	None	None	
Bernadette	October 16 – 28, 1973	Tropical cyclone	150 km/h (90 mph)	985 hPa (29.09 inHg)	None	None	None	
Christiane	December 13 – 21, 1973	Moderate tropical storm	75 km/h (45 mph)	995 hPa (29.38 inHg)	None	None	None	
Deidre–Delinda	December 26, 1973 – January 4, 1974	Intense Tropical cyclone	205 km/h (125 mph)	965 hPa (28.50 inHg)	None	None	None	
Esmeralda	December 30, 1973 – January 5, 1974	Moderate tropical storm	85 km/h (50 mph)	995 hPa (29.38 inHg)	None	None	None	
Fredegonde	February 24 – March 3, 1974	Tropical disturbance	45 km/h (30 mph)	1005 hPa (29.68 inHg)	None	None	None	
Ghislaine	February 24 – March 3, 1974	Tropical cyclone	150 km/h (90 mph)	985 hPa (29.09 inHg)	None	None	None	
Honorine	April 12 – 23, 1974	Severe tropical storm	95 km/h (60 mph)	998 hPa (29.47 inHg)	None	None	None	
Season aggregates
8 systems	20 January – 7 May		205 km/h (125 mph)	965 hPa (28.50 inHg)				

== See also ==
- Atlantic hurricane seasons: 1973, 1974
- Eastern Pacific hurricane seasons: 1973, 1974
- Western Pacific typhoon seasons: 1973, 1974
- North Indian Ocean cyclone seasons: 1973, 1974
