= 1973–74 South Pacific cyclone season =

Tropical cyclone season

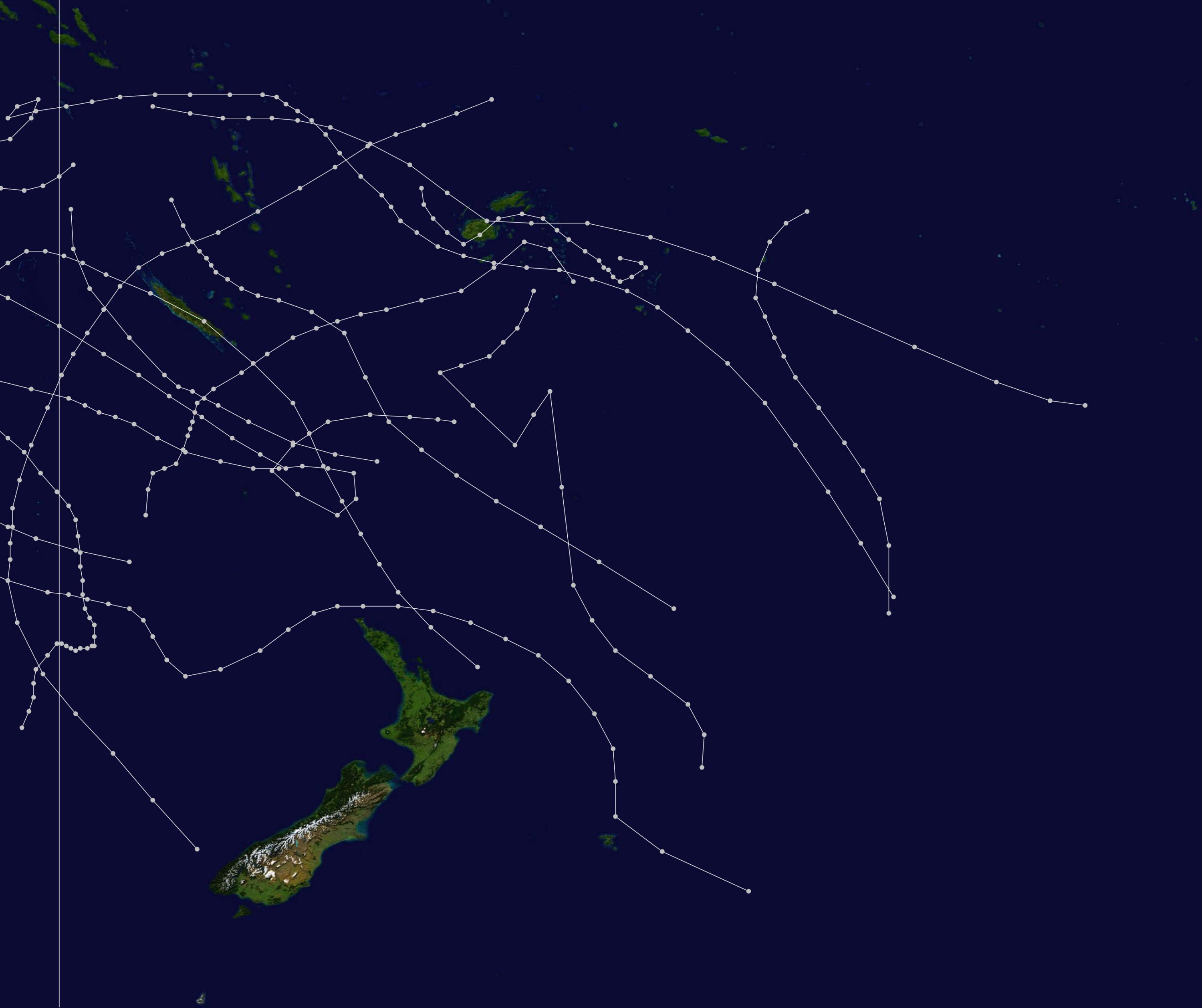
- Season summary map

Seasonal boundaries
- First system formed: November 7, 1973
- Last system dissipated: April 28, 1974

Strongest storm
- Name: Pam
  - Maximum winds: 195 km/h (120 mph) (10-minute sustained)
  - Lowest pressure: 925 hPa (mbar)

Seasonal statistics
- Total disturbances: 10
- Tropical cyclones: 10
- Severe tropical cyclones: 2
- Total fatalities: 85
- Total damage: Unknown

Related articles
- 1973–74 South-West Indian Ocean cyclone season; 1973–74 Australian region cyclone season

The 1973–74 South Pacific cyclone season was an inactive season. In tropical cyclones, it was an average season, but in strength, it was very inactive, with only two severe tropical cyclones.

== Systems ==
=== Tropical Cyclone SP7301 ===
- Category 1 tropical cyclone (Australian scale)
- Tropical storm (SSHWS)
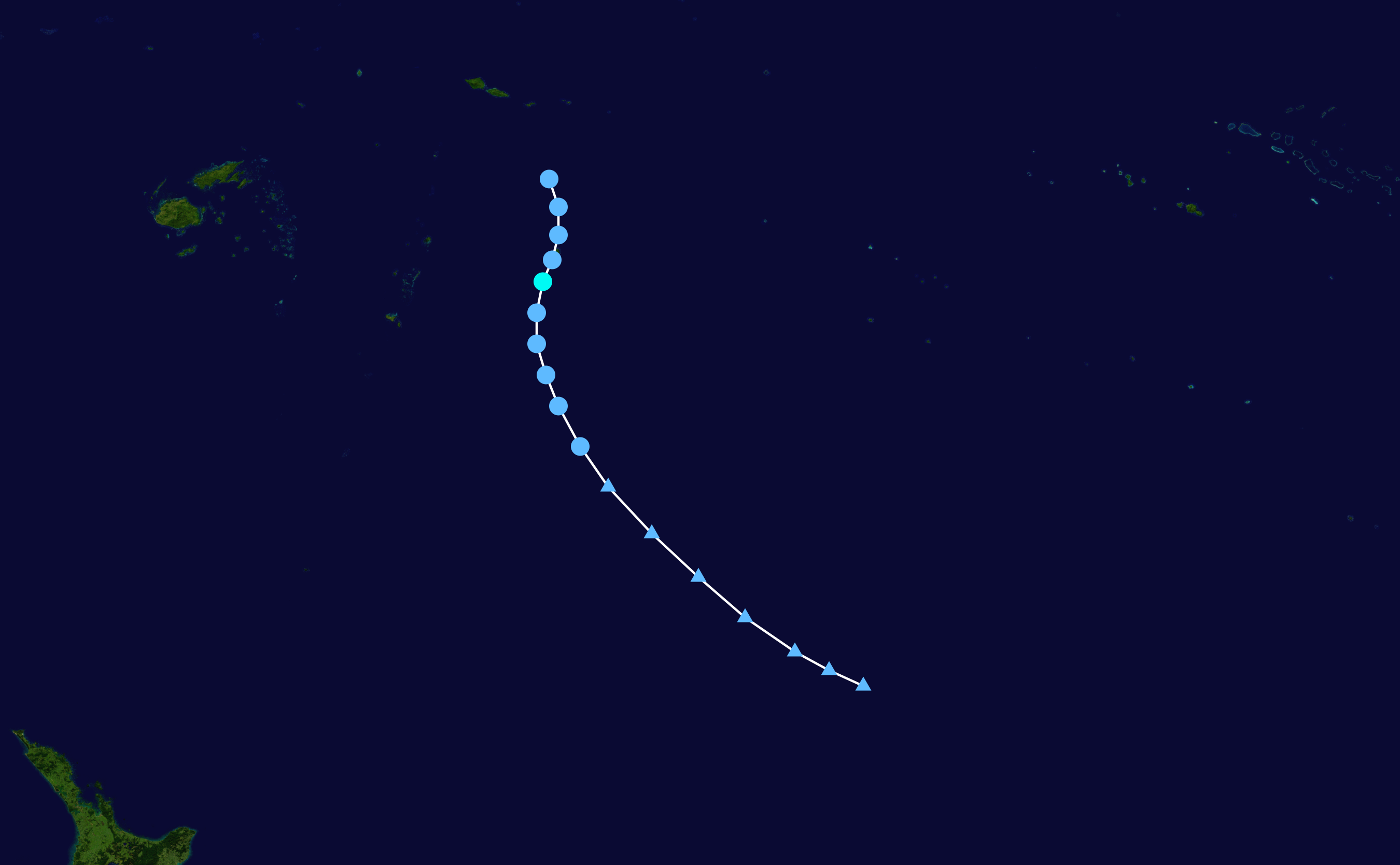
- Duration: November 7 – November 11
- Peak intensity: 65 km/h (40 mph) (10-min); 990 hPa (mbar)

=== Severe Tropical Cyclone Natalie–Lottie ===
- Category 3 severe tropical cyclone (Australian scale)
- Category 1 tropical cyclone (SSHWS)
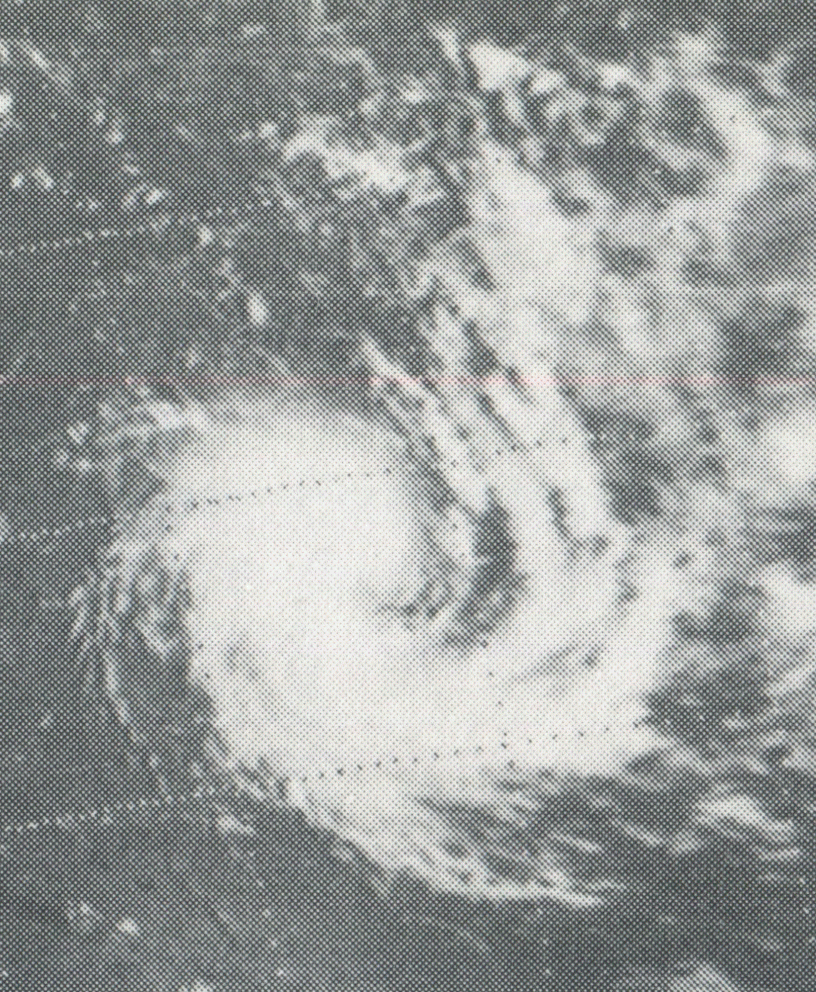
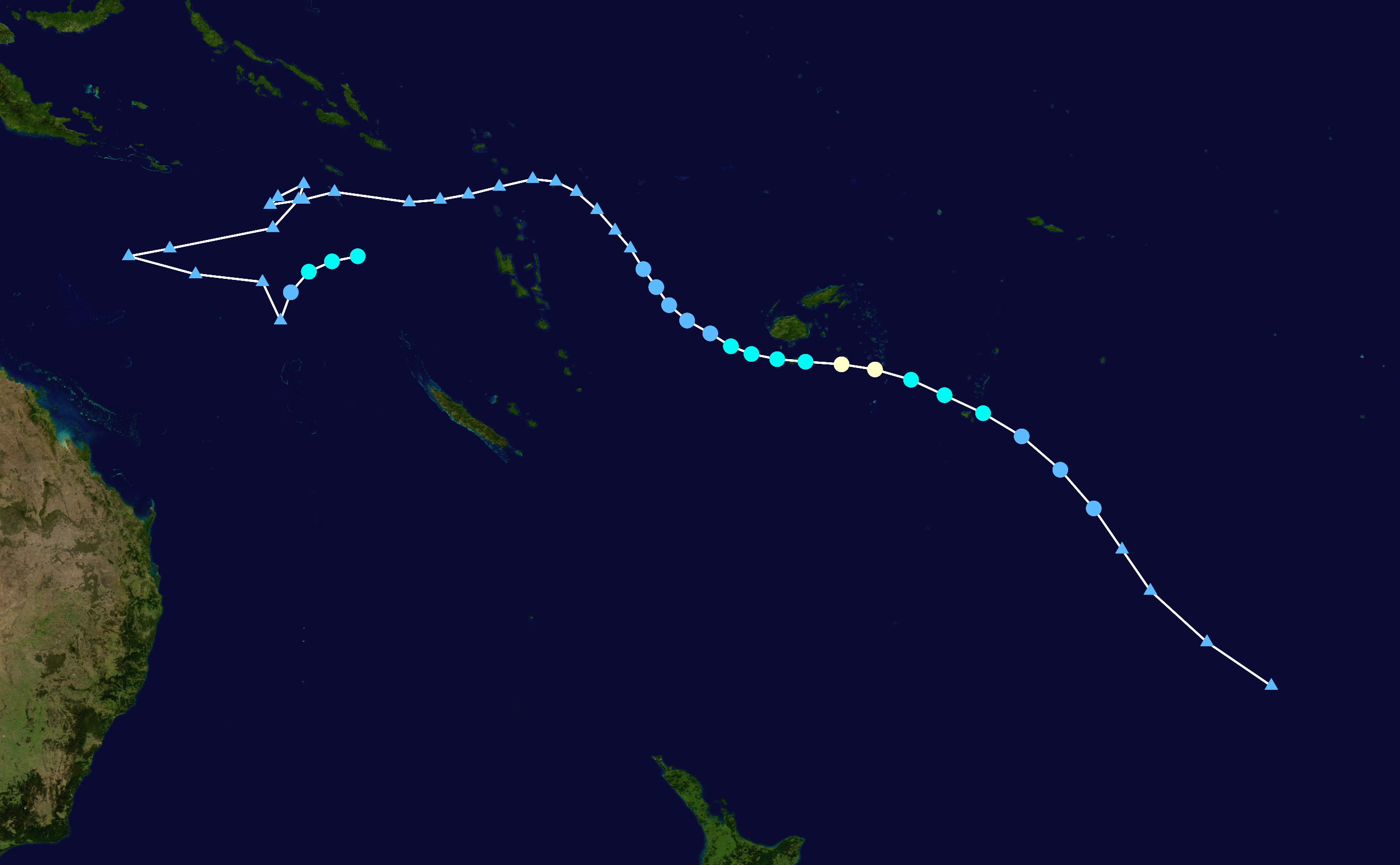
- Duration: December 1 – December 11
- Peak intensity: 120 km/h (75 mph) (10-min); 965 hPa (mbar)

This storm initially formed as Natalie, then moved into the Australian region on the same day. Later, it moved back into the South Pacific and was renamed Lottie. High seas caused the ship Uluilakeba to capsize killing more than 85 people. This makes Lottie one of the deadliest tropical cyclones in region in recent decades.

=== Tropical Cyclone Monica ===
- Category 1 tropical cyclone (Australian scale)
- Tropical storm (SSHWS)
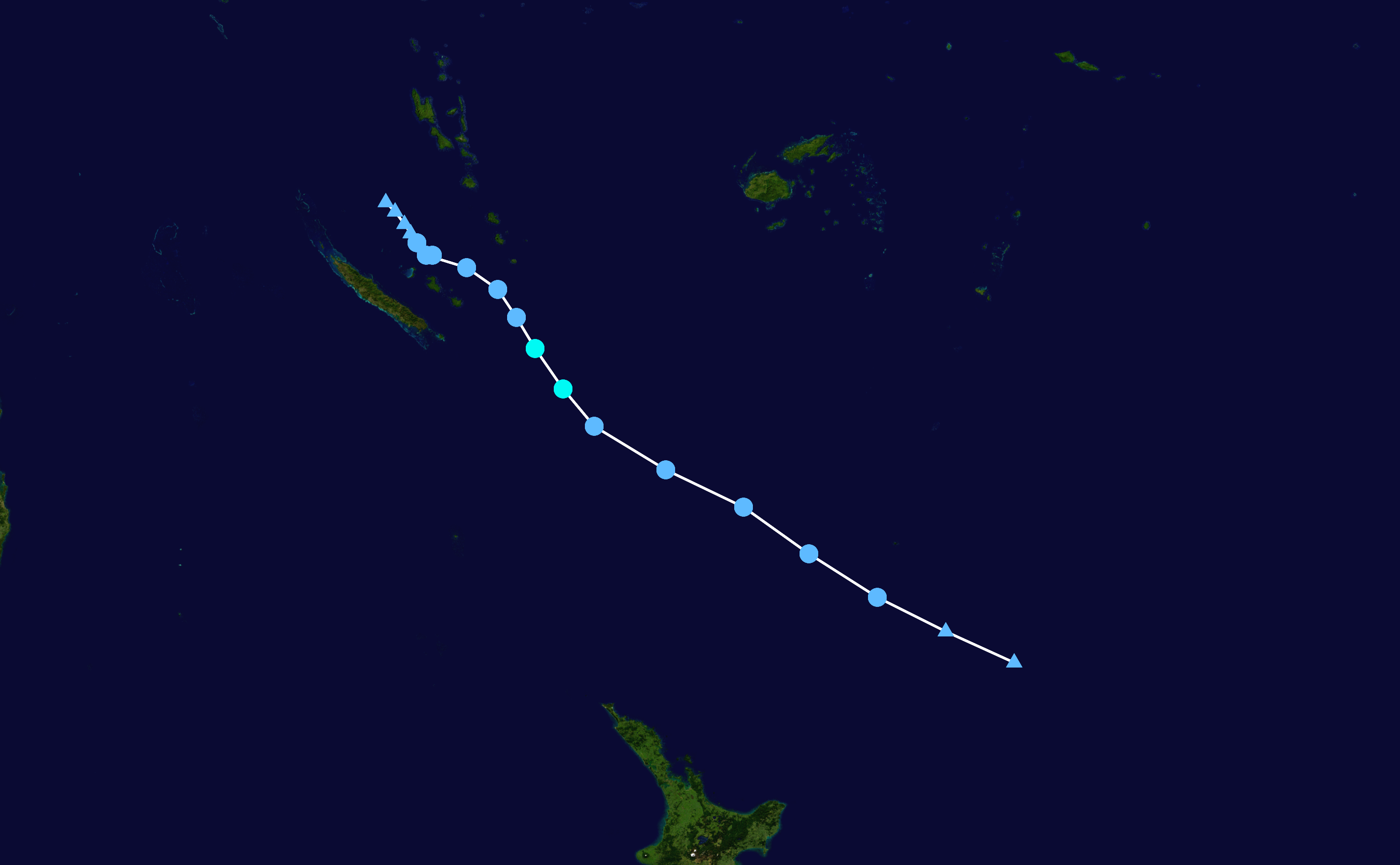
- Duration: January 15 – January 20
- Peak intensity: 65 km/h (40 mph) (10-min); 990 hPa (mbar)

=== Tropical Cyclone Nessie ===
- Category 1 tropical cyclone (Australian scale)
- Tropical storm (SSHWS)
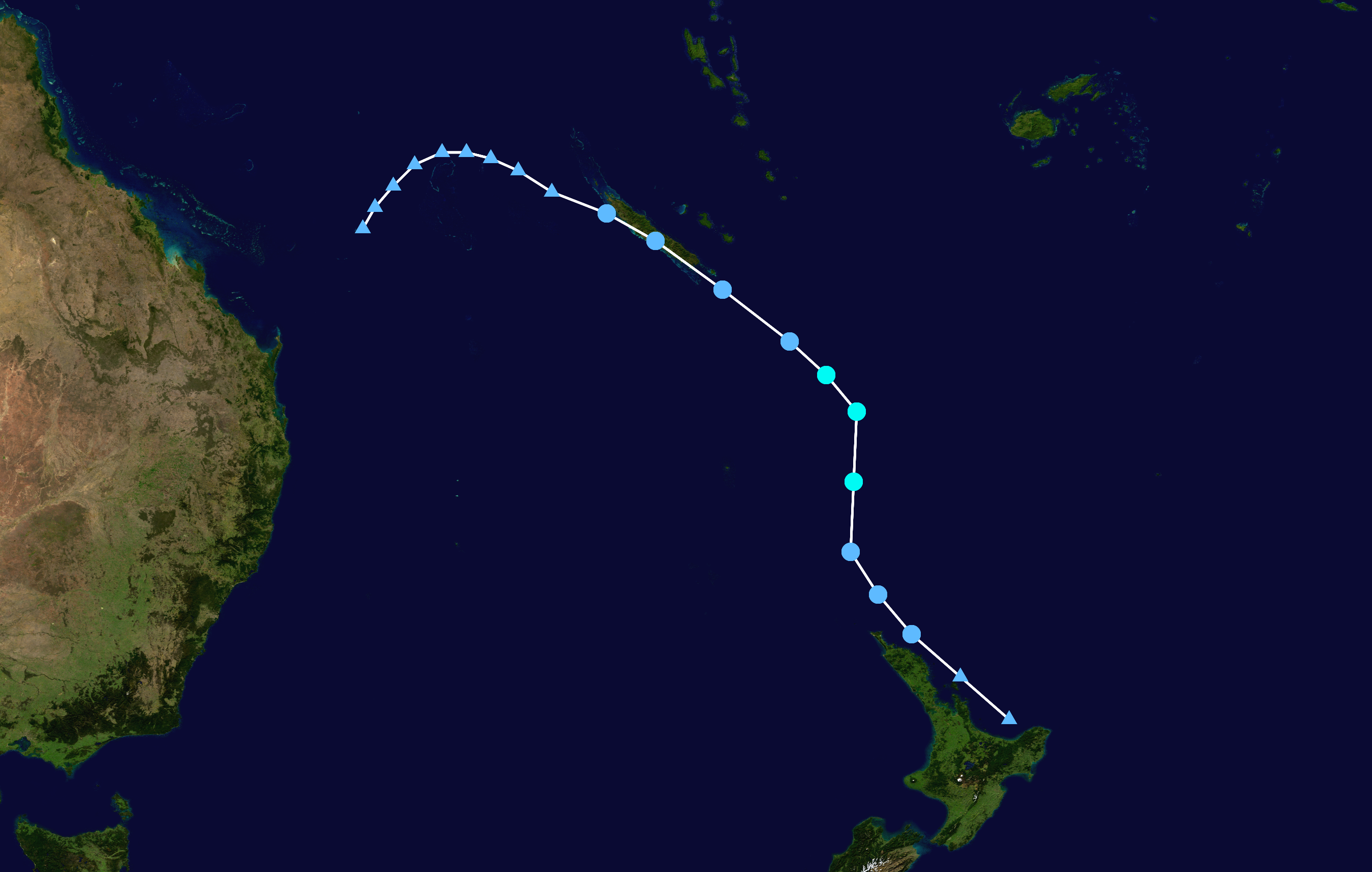
- Duration: January 17 – January 22
- Peak intensity: 65 km/h (40 mph) (10-min); 990 hPa (mbar)

=== Tropical Cyclone Vera ===
- Category 2 tropical cyclone (Australian scale)
- Tropical storm (SSHWS)
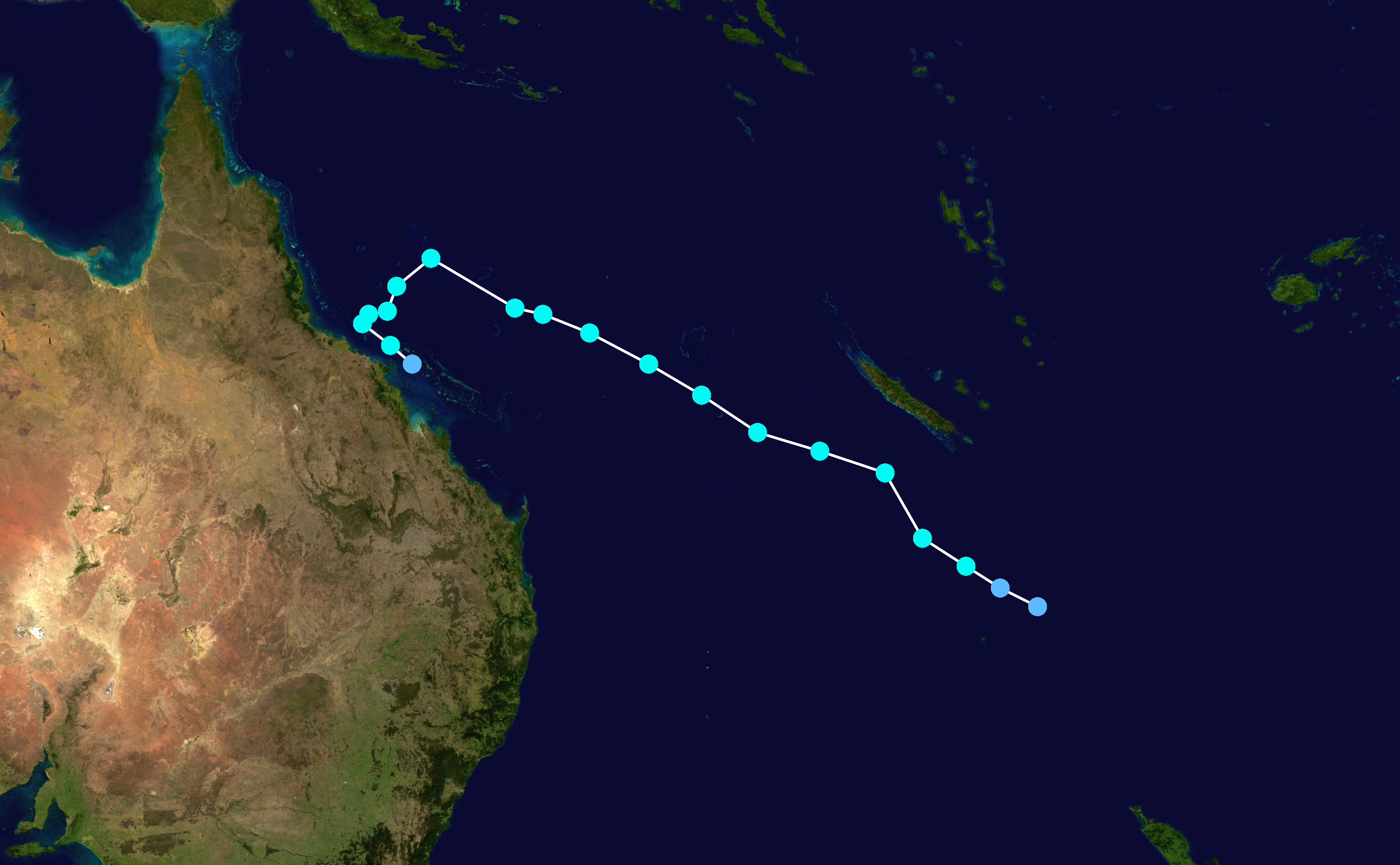
- Duration: January 21 – January 22
- Peak intensity: 95 km/h (60 mph) (10-min); 985 hPa (mbar)

=== Severe Tropical Cyclone Pam ===
- Category 4 severe tropical cyclone (Australian scale)
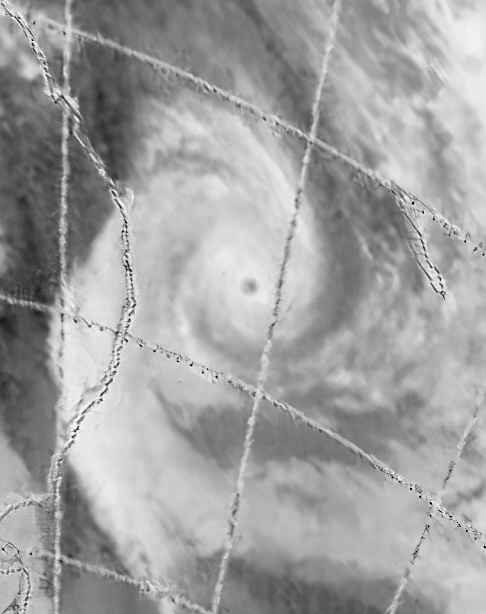
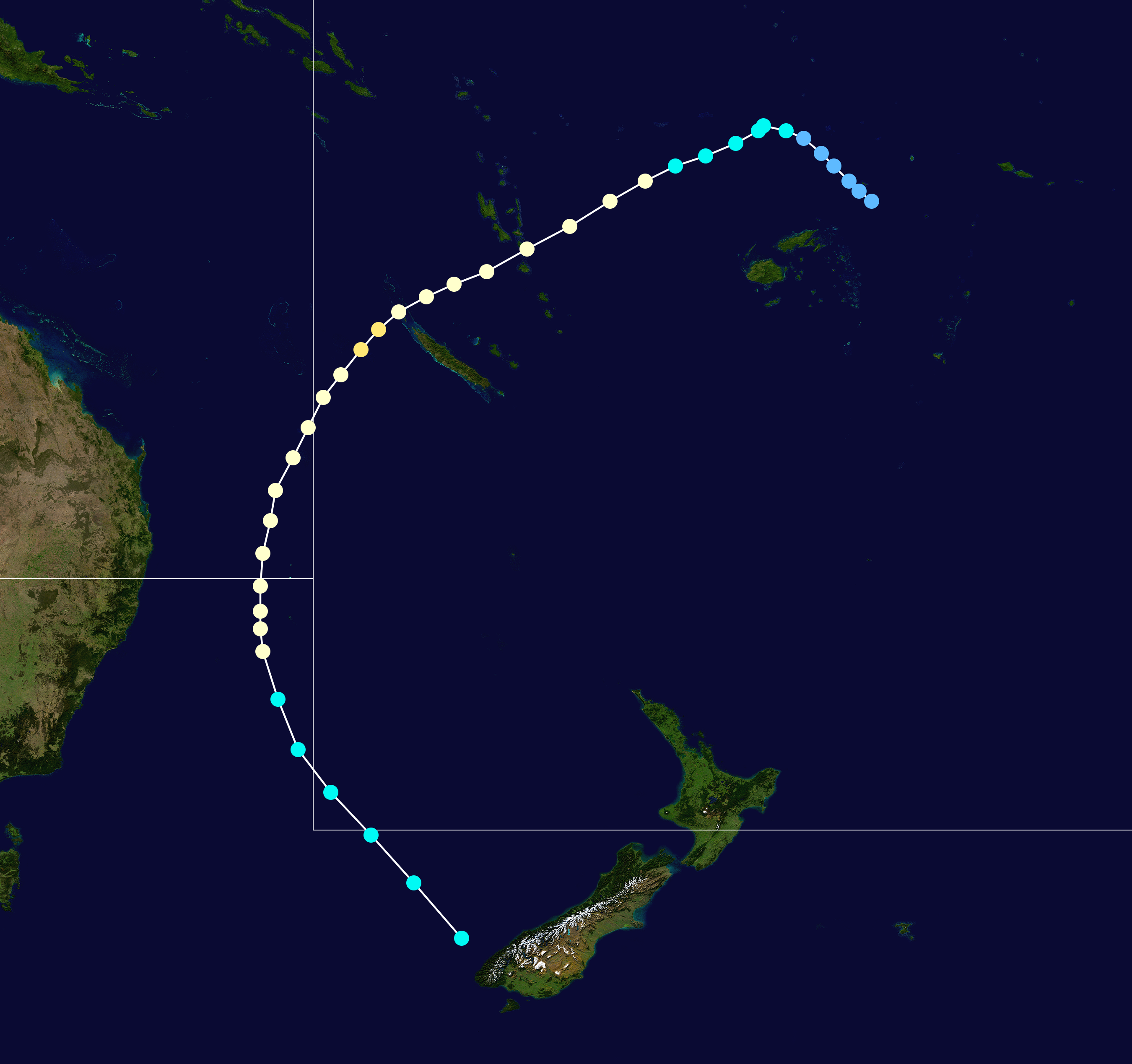
- Duration: January 30 – February 8
- Peak intensity: 195 km/h (120 mph) (10-min); 925 hPa (mbar)

=== Tropical Cyclone Rebecca ===
- Category 1 tropical cyclone (Australian scale)
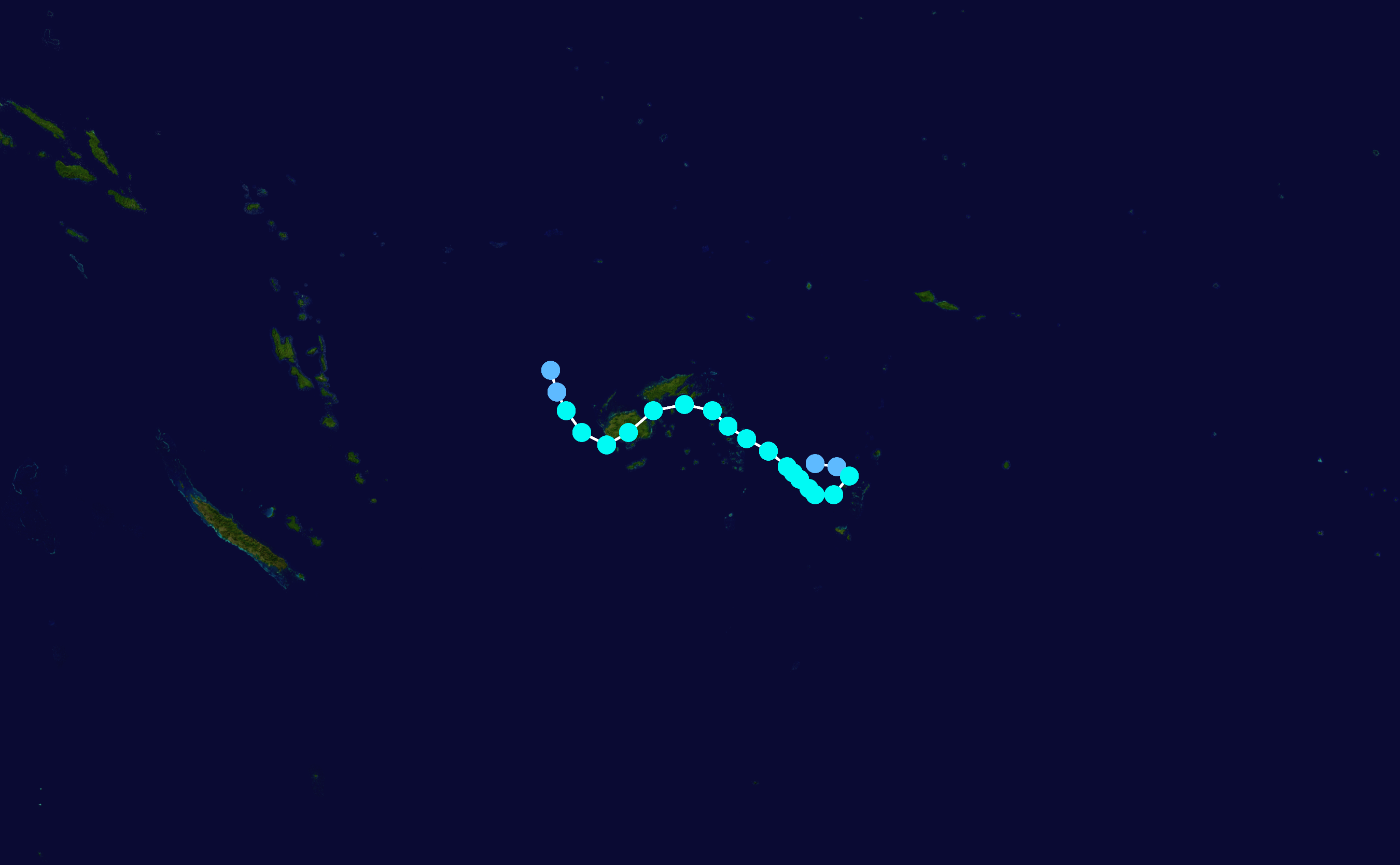
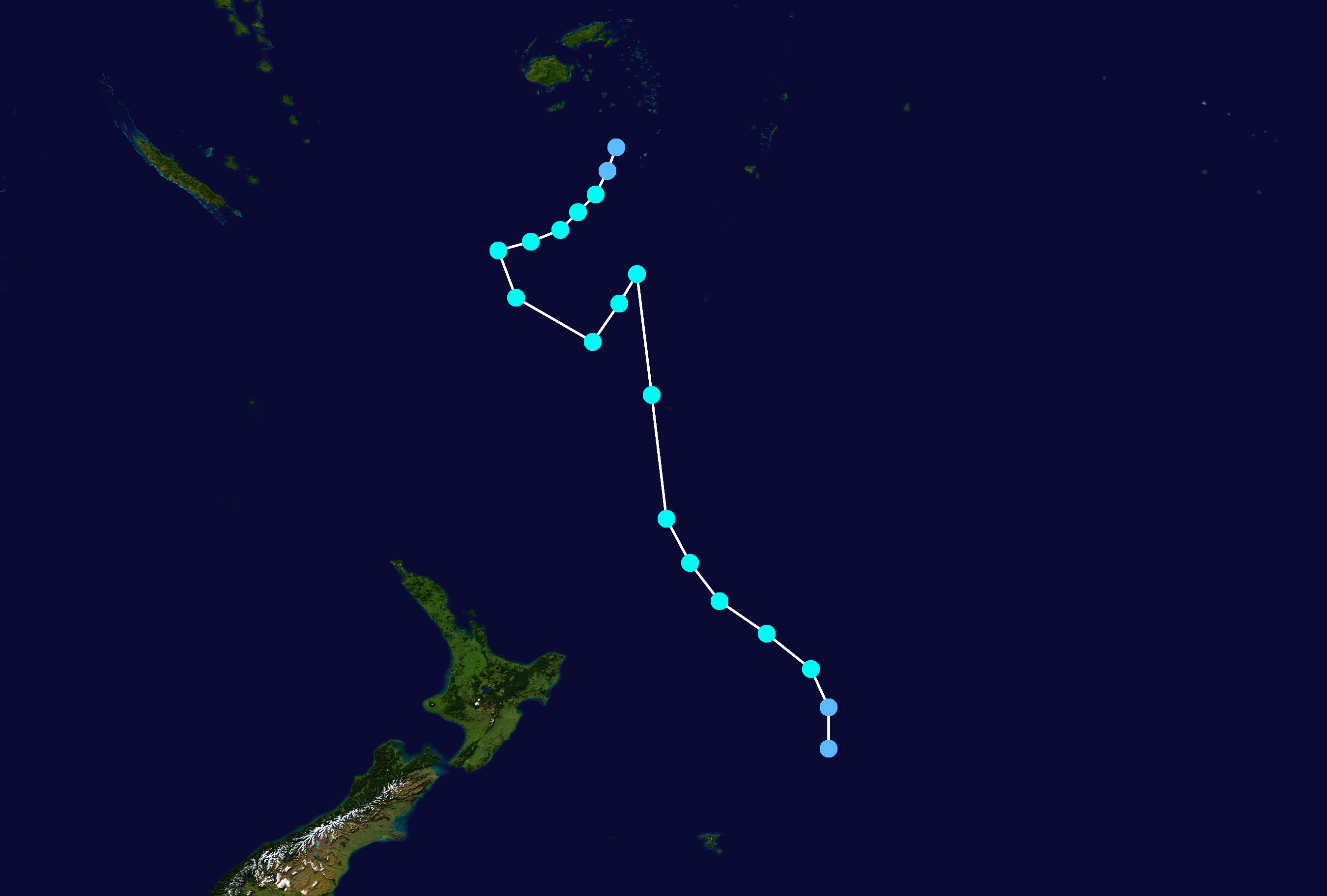
- Duration: February 19 – February 28
- Peak intensity: 75 km/h (45 mph) (10-min); 988 hPa (mbar)

Rebecca was thought to have had a complex evolution with two low-level circulation centres. It had peak 10-minute sustained windspeeds of 75 km/h (45 mph) and a minimum pressure of 988 hPa (29.18 inHg), before it dissipated during February 28.

=== Tropical Cyclone Zoe ===
- Category 2 tropical cyclone (Australian scale)
- Tropical storm (SSHWS)
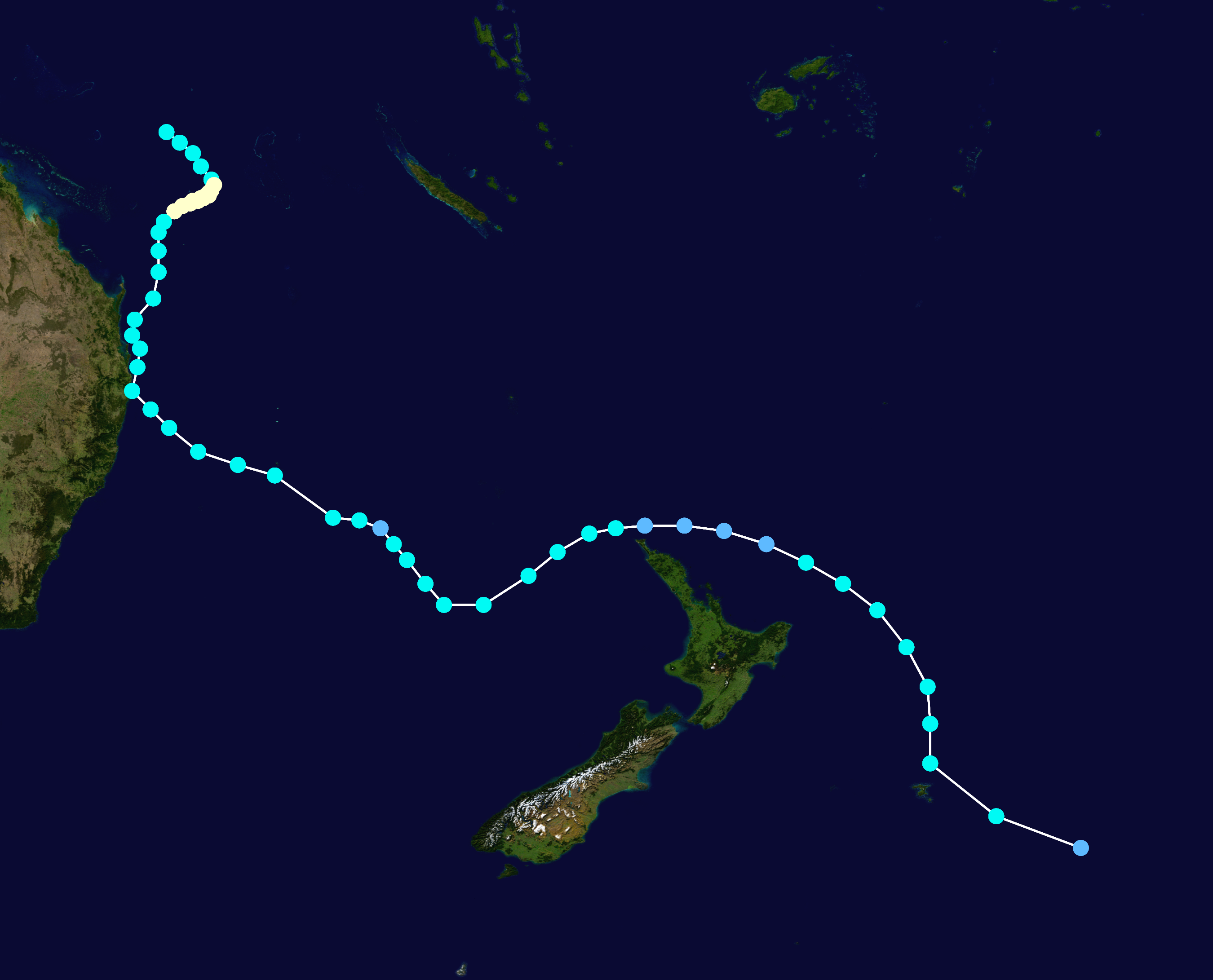
- Duration: March 14 – March 20
- Peak intensity: 100 km/h (65 mph) (10-min); 980 hPa (mbar)

=== Tropical Cyclone Alice ===
- Category 2 tropical cyclone (Australian scale)
- Tropical storm (SSHWS)
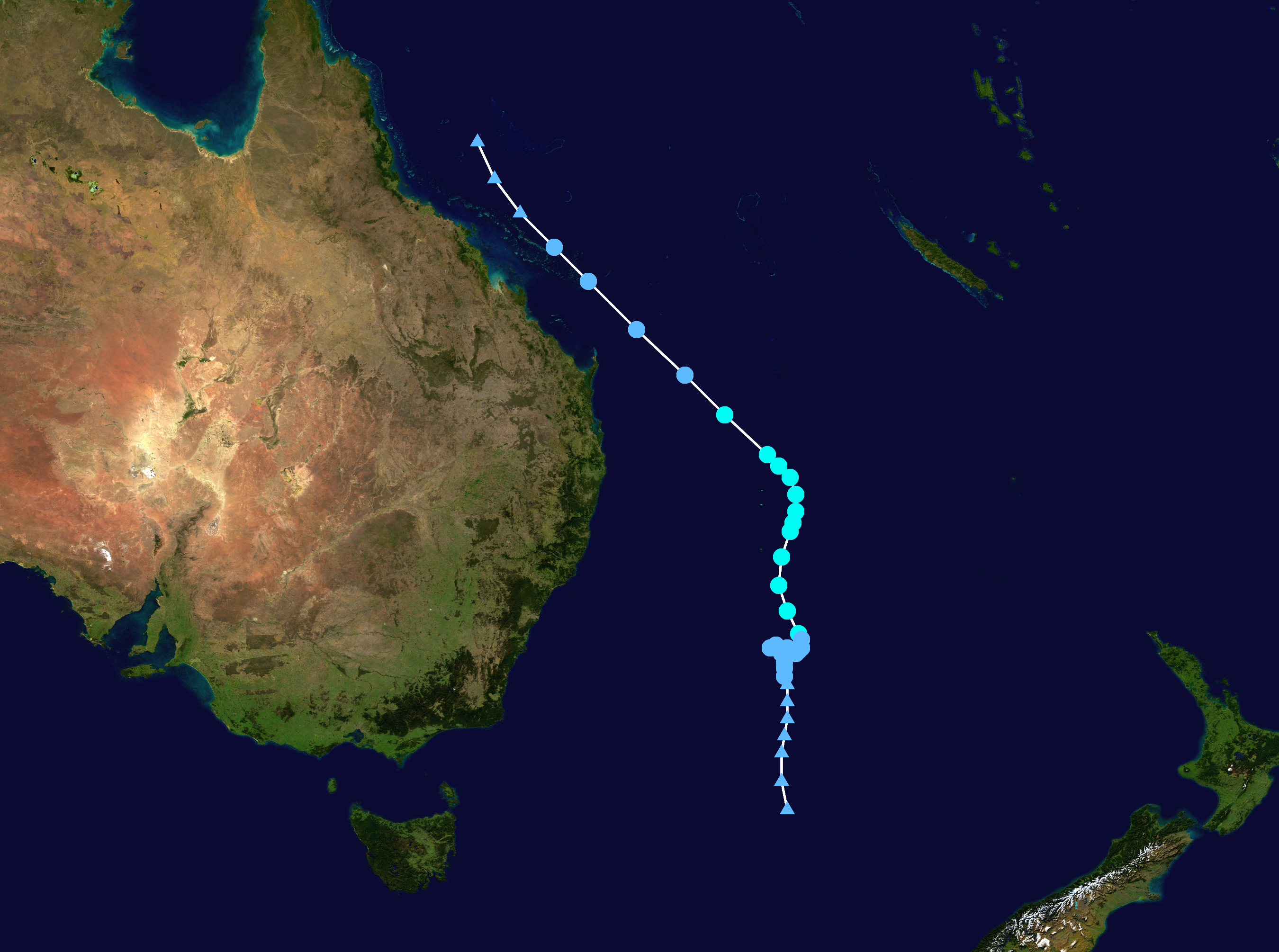
- Duration: March 23 – March 30
- Peak intensity: 100 km/h (65 mph) (10-min); 980 hPa (mbar)

=== Tropical Cyclone Tina ===
- Category 2 tropical cyclone (Australian scale)
- Tropical storm (SSHWS)
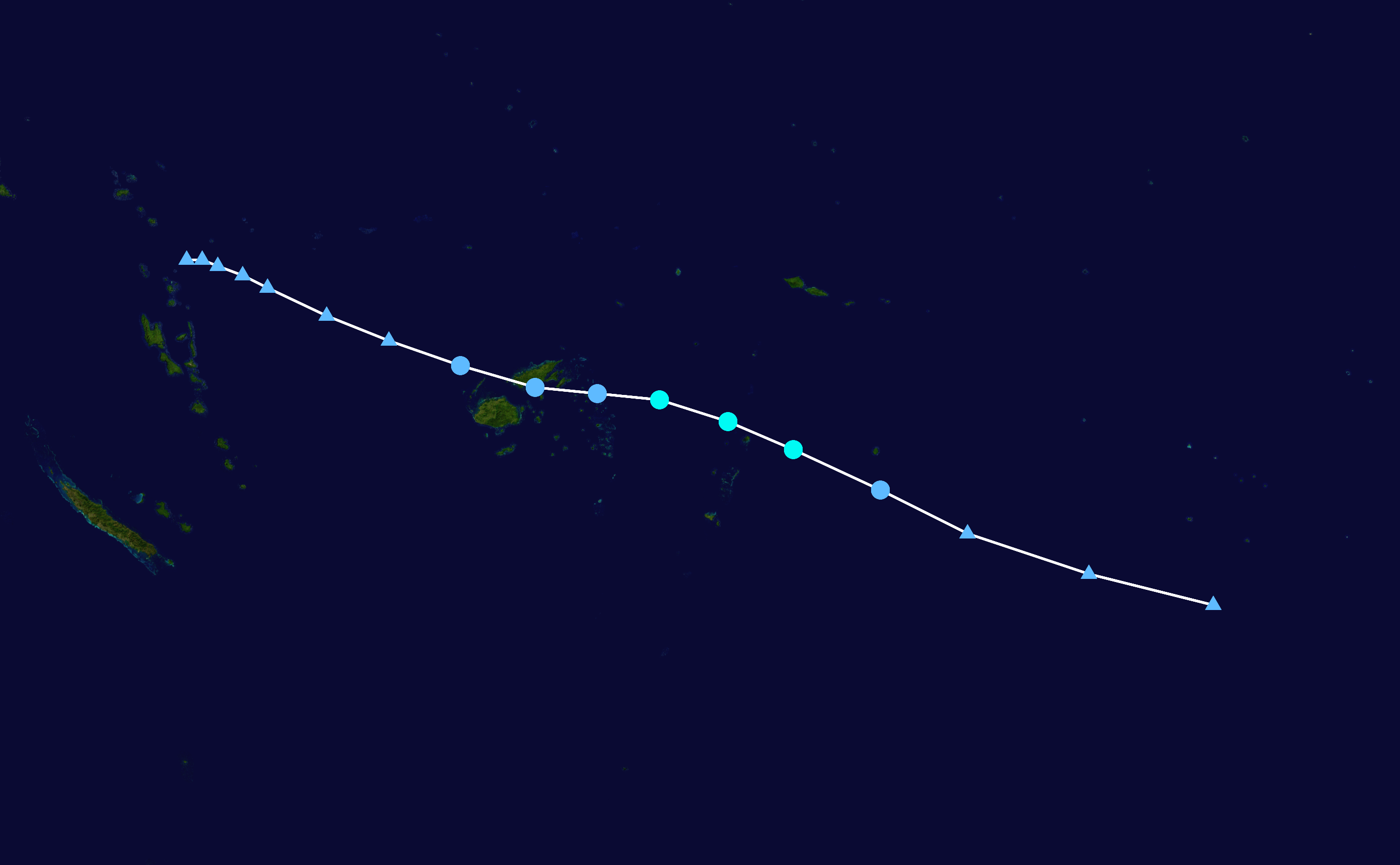
- Duration: April 23 – April 28
- Peak intensity: 100 km/h (65 mph) (10-min); 980 hPa (mbar)

== Seasonal effects ==
Name	Dates	Peak intensity			Areas affected	Damage (USD)	Deaths	Ref(s).
Name	Dates	Category	Wind speed	Pressure	Areas affected	Damage (USD)	Deaths	Ref(s).
SP7301	November 7 – 11	Category 1 tropical cyclone	65 km/h (40 mph)	990 hPa (29.23 inHg)				
Natalie-Lottie	December 1 – 11	Category 3 severe tropical cyclone	120 km/h (75 mph)	965 hPa (28.50 inHg)				
Monica	January 15 – 20	Category 1 tropical cyclone	65 km/h (40 mph)	990 hPa (29.23 inHg)				
Nessie	January 17 – 22	Category 1 tropical cyclone	65 km/h (40 mph)	990 hPa (29.23 inHg)				
Vera	January 21 – 22	Category 2 tropical cyclone	100 km/h (65 mph)	980 hPa (28.94 inHg)				
Pam	January 30 – February 8	Category 4 severe tropical cyclone	195 km/h (120 mph)	925 hPa (27.32 inHg)				
Rebecca	February 19 – 28	Category 1 tropical cyclone	75 km/h (45 mph)	988 hPa (29.18 inHg)				
Zoe	March 14 – 20	Category 2 tropical cyclone	100 km/h (65 mph)	980 hPa (28.94 inHg)				
Alice	March 23 – 30	Category 2 tropical cyclone	100 km/h (65 mph)	980 hPa (28.94 inHg)				
Tina	April 23 – 28	Category 2 tropical cyclone	100 km/h (65 mph)	980 hPa (28.94 inHg)				
Season aggregates
8 systems	October 19 – April 6		155 km/h (100 mph)	945 hPa (27.91 inHg)				

== See also ==
- Atlantic hurricane seasons: 1973, 1974
- Eastern Pacific hurricane seasons: 1973, 1974
- Western Pacific typhoon seasons: 1973, 1974
- North Indian Ocean cyclone seasons: 1973, 1974
