= List of storms named Xavier =

The name Xavier has been used for four tropical cyclones and one extratropical cyclone worldwide.

In the Eastern Pacific:

- Tropical Storm Xavier (1992), a weak tropical storm that did not approach land.
- Tropical Storm Xavier (2018), tropical storm that brushed southwestern Mexico.

In the South Pacific:

- Cyclone Xavier (2006), a strong pre-season cyclone which formed to the north of the Santa Cruz Islands.
- Cyclone Xavier (2026), a Category 5 severe tropical cyclone that became the most intense cyclone in the month of November.

In Europe:

- Cyclone Xavier (2017), a storm that affected Northern Europe in 2017.

== See also ==
- Cyclone Xaver, a winter storm that affected Europe in 2013.
- List of storms named Javier, a similar name which has also been used in the Eastern Pacific.
