= Cyclone Lola =

Category 5 South Pacific cyclone in 2023

Severe Tropical Cyclone Lola
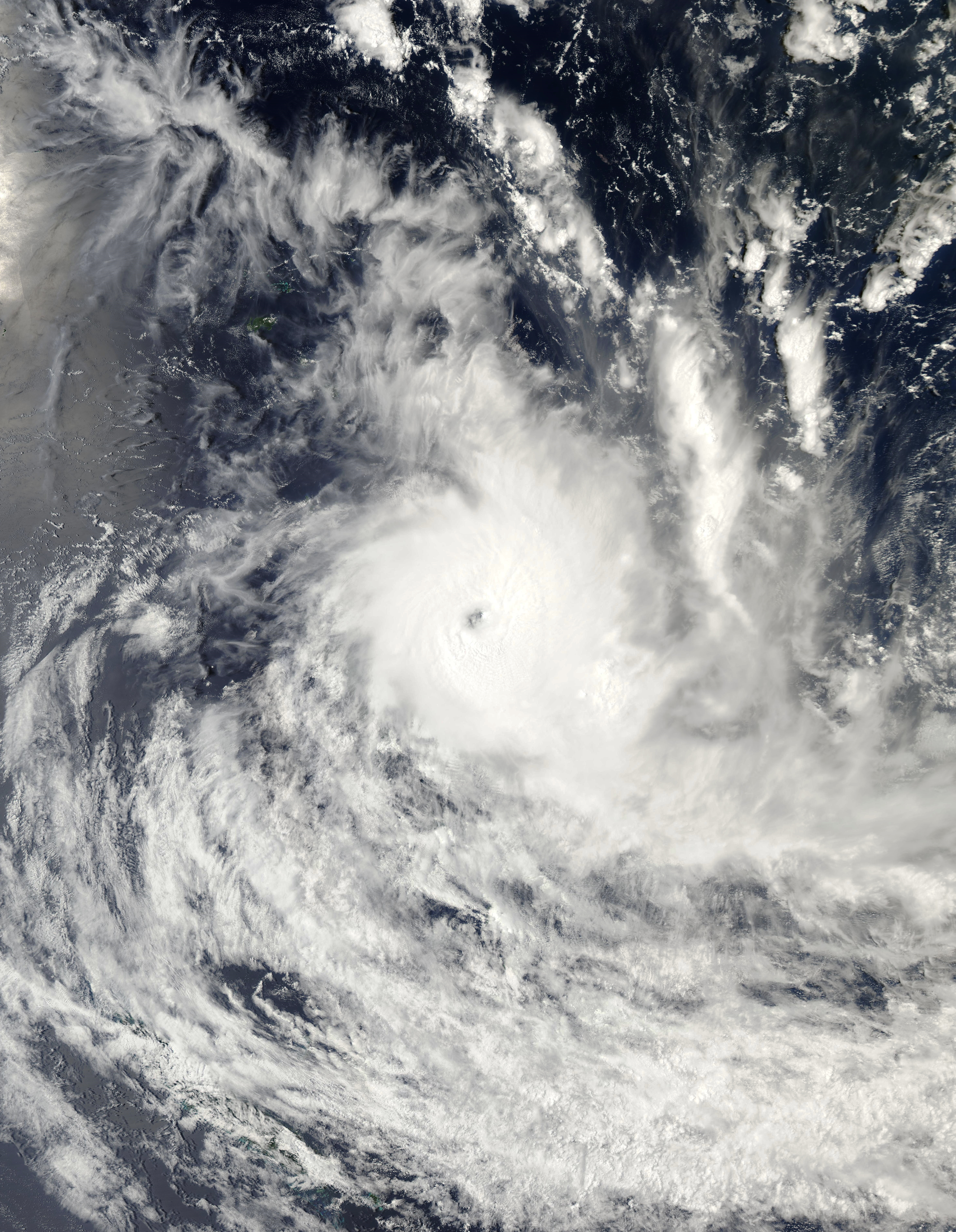
- Lola at its peak intensity off Vanuatu on 24 October

Meteorological history
- Formed: 19 October 2023
- Dissipated: 27 October 2023

Category 5 severe tropical cyclone
- 10-minute sustained (FMS)
- Highest winds: 215 km/h (130 mph)
- Highest gusts: 295 km/h (185 mph)
- Lowest pressure: 930 hPa (mbar); 27.46 inHg

Category 4-equivalent tropical cyclone
- 1-minute sustained (SSHWS/JTWC)
- Highest winds: 230 km/h (145 mph)
- Lowest pressure: 937 hPa (mbar); 27.67 inHg

Overall effects
- Fatalities: 4
- Injuries: 4
- Damage: $352 million (2023 USD)
- Areas affected: Vanuatu, Solomon Islands, New Caledonia, New Zealand
- IBTrACS
- Part of the 2023–24 South Pacific cyclone season

Severe Tropical Cyclone Lola was the strongest off-season tropical cyclone in the Southern Hemisphere, surpassing the previous record held by Cyclone Donna in 2017. The first tropical cyclone and severe tropical cyclone of the 2023–24 South Pacific cyclone season, Lola was first noted as an area of low pressure to the northeast of Honiara in the Solomon Islands. Over the next few days, the system gradually developed further, before it was classified as a tropical cyclone and named Lola by the Fiji Meteorological Service (FMS) on 22 October. Later that same day, Lola rapidly intensified into a Category 4 intensity was reached by 12:00 UTC that day, with Lola exhibiting maximum ten-minute sustained winds of 175 km/h (110 mph). With convective rain bands wrapping into the circulation, the Joint Typhoon Warning Center (JTWC) assessed Lola as having one-minute sustained winds of 215 km/h (130 mph). At the same time, the FMS followed suit and upgraded the system to a Category 5 severe tropical cyclone. Over the next few days, the cyclone's weakening accelerated as it moved southwards before degenerated into a tropical depression on 26 October. Cyclone Lola was the third severe tropical cyclone to impact Vanuatu during 2023, after Cyclones Judy and Kevin had impacted the island nation earlier that year. The cyclone caused at least four deaths and left at least four injured.

== Meteorological history ==
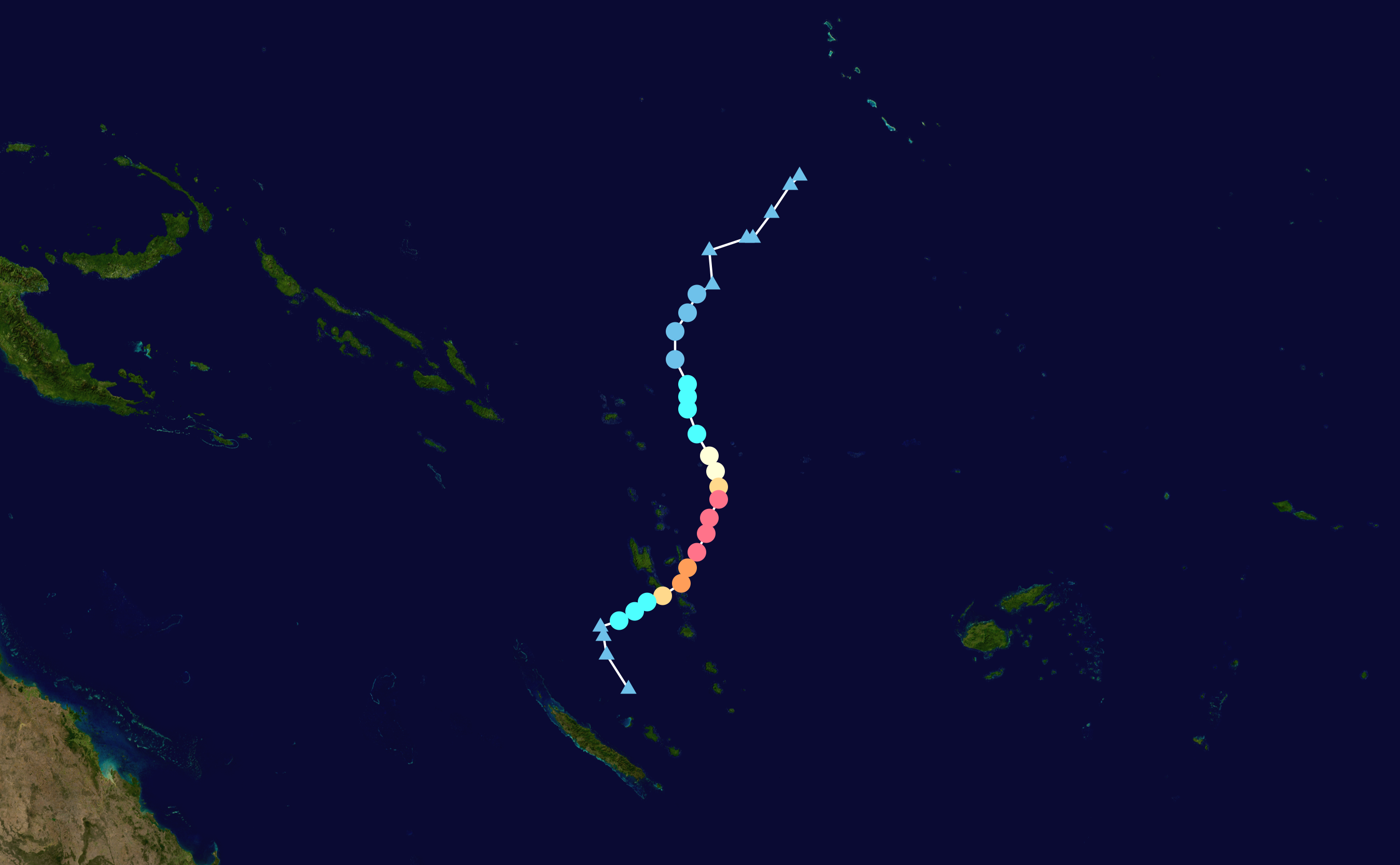
Map plotting the storm's track and intensity, according to the Saffir–Simpson scale Map key Saffir–Simpson scale Tropical depression (≤38 mph, ≤62 km/h) Tropical storm (39–73 mph, 63–118 km/h) Category 1 (74–95 mph, 119–153 km/h) Category 2 (96–110 mph, 154–177 km/h) Category 3 (111–129 mph, 178–208 km/h) Category 4 (130–156 mph, 209–251 km/h) Category 5 (≥157 mph, ≥252 km/h) Unknown Storm type Tropical cyclone Subtropical cyclone Extratropical cyclone, remnant low, tropical disturbance, or monsoon depression

On 19 October, the Fiji Meteorological Service reported that Tropical Disturbance 01F had developed out of an area of low pressure, about 1295 km (805 mi) to the northeast of Honiara in the Solomon Islands. At this time the system was located in an area favourable for further development, with warm sea-surface temperatures of 30–31 °C (86–88 °F) and low to moderate vertical windshear. Over the next couple of days, the system gradually developed further as it moved south-westwards towards the Santa Cruz Islands, before it was classified as a tropical depression by the FMS on 21 October. Several hours later, the Joint Typhoon Warning Center (JTWC) issued a Tropical Cyclone Formation Alert (TCFA), after the system developed a partially exposed low-level circulation center. Over the next couple of days, the system gradually moved southwestward before the FMS classified it as a tropical depression. The convective structure improved considerably, and the JTWC initiated advisories on the system and classified it as Tropical Cyclone 01P at 21:00 UTC. The cyclone drifted southward until an upper-level ridge forced the storm to the south. The FMS subsequently named the system Lola at around 03:00 UTC on 22 October, after it had developed into a Category 1 tropical cyclone on the Australian tropical cyclone intensity scale.

Lola intensified into a Category 2 tropical cyclone twelve hours later, as fragmented banding that was wrapping broadly into the slowly consolidating central dense overcast (CDO). The JTWC upgraded Lola to a Category 1-equivalent cyclone on the Saffir–Simpson hurricane wind scale (SSHWS), with maximum one-sustained winds of 120 km/h (75 mph). By early on 23 October, Lola had intensified into a Category 3 tropical cyclone, while the system's depiction showed that tightly wrapped convective banding was circulating around a ragged eye. Lola rapidly intensified into a Category 4 intensity was reached by 12:00 UTC that day, with Lola exhibiting maximum ten-minute sustained winds of 175 km/h (110 mph).

At 0000 UTC on 24 October, the JTWC reported that Lola had peaked with 1-minute sustained winds estimated at 230 km/h (145 mph), which made it equivalent to a category 4 tropical cyclone on the Saffir-Simpson hurricane wind scale. At around the same time, the FMS estimated that Lola had peaked with 10-minute sustained winds of 215 km/h (130 mph), which made it a Category 5 severe tropical cyclone. As a result, Lola become the earliest Category 5 tropical cyclone on record in the southern hemisphere. Lola's eye quickly disappeared, signaling a phase of rapid weakening. Rapidly weakened due to vertical wind shear, Lola made landfall in Sowan, at around 03:00 UTC on 25 October. The FMS and the JTWC reported that Lola's winds weakened to 100 km/h (65 mph), for the weakening system tracked over the Malakula. During 26 October, Lola degenerated into a tropical depression, before it was last noted the next day and the JTWC issued their final advisory on the storm.

Lola's remnants passed near New Caledonia's Loyalty Islands during 27 October, before they were last noted later that day, as they moved out of the FMS area of responsibility and into New Zealand's area of responsibility monitored by MetService.

== Impact ==
Costliest South Pacific Ocean tropical cyclones
Rank	Tropical cyclones	Season	Damage USD	Refs
1	3 Gabrielle	2022–23	$9.2 billion	
2	TD 06F	2022–23	$1.43 billion	
3	5 Winston	2015–16	$1.4 billion	
4	5 Harold	2019–20	$768 million	
5	5 Pam	2014–15	$543 million	
6	5 Judy and Kevin	2022–23	$433 million	
7	4 Val	1991–92	$381 million	
8	5 Lola	2023–24	$352 million	
9	4 Evan	2012–13	$313 million	
10	4 Gita	2017–18	$253 million	

=== Vanuatu ===
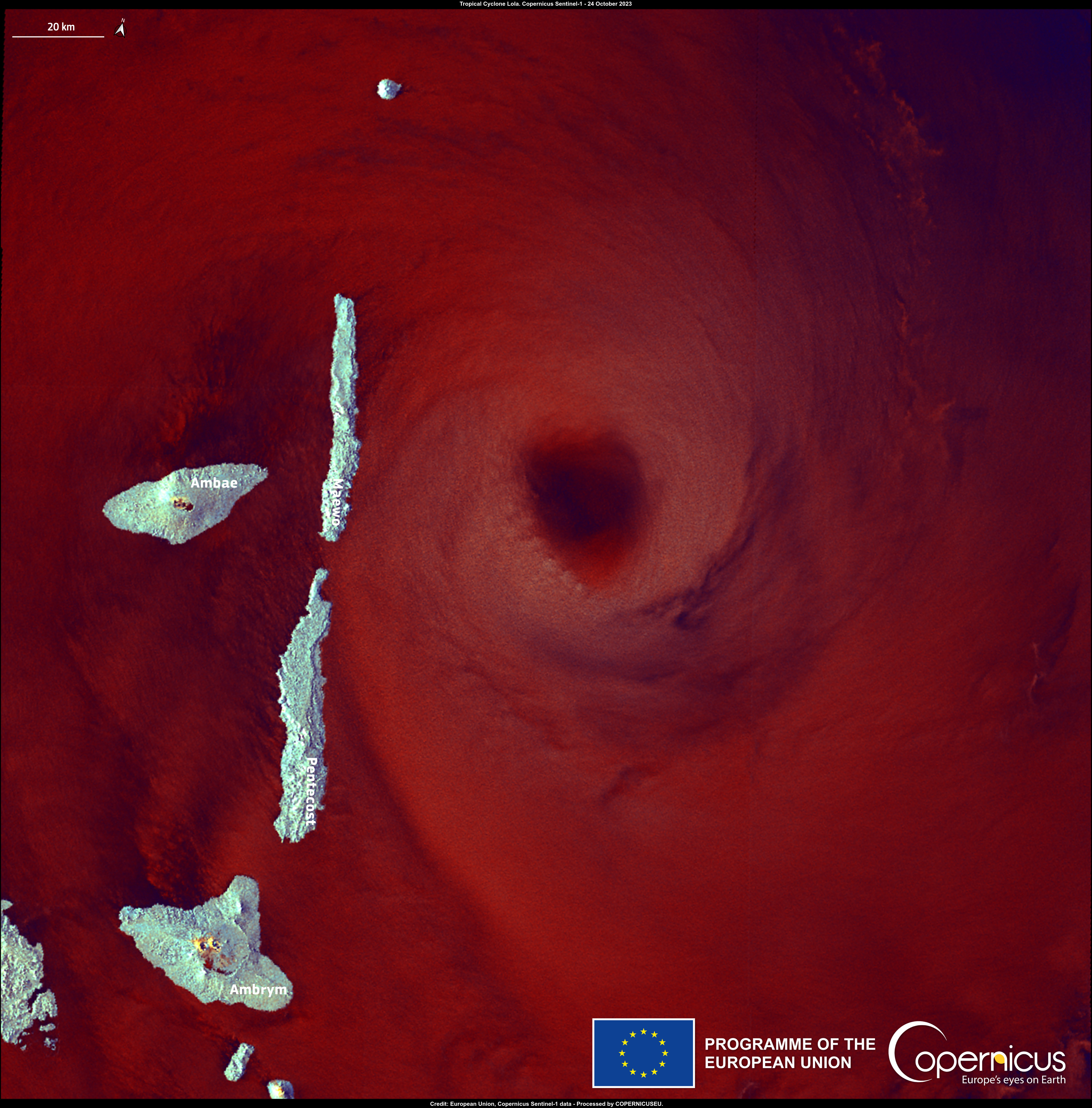
The eye of Cyclone Lola to the east of Maewo on 24 October

The National Disaster Management Office (NDMO), a disaster relief and rescue plan agency, was activated in six provinces and prepared to conduct an immediate assessment following the cyclone. All government buildings, markets, and banks are closed until further notice in the capital city of Port Vila. On 23 October, the Vanuatu National Disaster Management Office (VNDMO) issued a yellow alert—indicating the threat of a tropical cyclone within 12 hours—for Penama and Sanma. The Vanuatu Meteorology and Geo-Hazards Department also issued a tropical cyclone warning for these areas.

Vanuatu Prime Minister Charlot Salwai took a Royal Australian Air Force to inspect the early damage. Additionally, the New Zealand, Australian, and French defense forces will provide further aid and assess damages. In Ambrym, two women, one of whom was pregnant, were reportedly killed. Damage across the nation were estimated to be 43.28 billion vatu (US$352 million).

Due to a communications breakdown on the islands, those reports were limited, but local officials told that homes, schools, and crops had been devastated by the central provinces of Penama and Malampa. Pentecost, Malakula, and Ambrym have been most severely affected; It is estimated that 50% of all homes there have suffered damage. UNICEF reported that Vanuatu requested support from the Union Civil Protection Mechanism (UCPM). The agency had emergency stockpiles in place across the country, including surveillance flight, shelter kits, tarpaulins. On 30 October, New Zealand Foreign Minister Nanaia Mahuta announced that New Zealand would contribute NZ$450,000 in relief aid to Vanuatu; including NZ$350,000 to the Adventist Development and Relief Agency and NZ$100,000 to the Vanuatu government.

=== Solomon Islands and New Zealand ===
The Solomon Islands National Disaster Management Office (NDMO) reported that Cyclone Lola had severe impacts on Tikopia. Lola caused four people, including a young child, to suffer injuries; 116 homes, and one church were destroyed. Additionally, the phone tower has been damaged. The remnants of Cyclone Lola merged with a low-pressure system in the Tasman Sea before impacting northern areas of New Zealand on 30 October. Severe weather caused flooding and power cuts across the upper North Island, while strong winds damaged power lines and led to cancelled flights. A cruise ship bound for Auckland had to shelter near Rangitoto after the weather closed the port.

=== Retirement ===
Due to extensive damages caused by the cyclone in Vanuatu and New Caledonia, Lola was retired by the World Meteorological Organisation on August 5, 2024. It was replaced with the name Lute.

== See also ==
- Weather of 2023
- Tropical cyclones in 2023
- Cyclone Xavier (2006) - another strong cyclone which formed in a similar region and timeframe
- Cyclone Donna (2017) - another strong cyclone which became the strongest off-season storm in the region at the time
- Cyclones Judy and Kevin (2023) - Pair of strong South Pacific cyclones that had affected Vanuatu earlier that year
