= Sowan =

Island in Vanuatu

Native name: Îlot Sowan
- Interactive map of Sowan

Geography
- Location: Pacific Ocean
- Coordinates: 16°7′59.98″S 167°26′59.99″E
- Archipelago: Vanuatu
- Highest elevation: 177 m (581 ft)

Administration
- Vanuatu
- Province: Malampa Province

Sowan (Îlot Sowan) is a small, uninhabited island in the Malampa Province of Vanuatu.

== Geography ==
Sowan is located 4.5 km from Lakatoro on Malekula Island. Sowan is a long sandbar with some vegetation. The estimated elevation of the terrain above sea level is about 177 metres. It's a favourite haunt of wild ducks.
