= 1983 Pacific typhoon season =

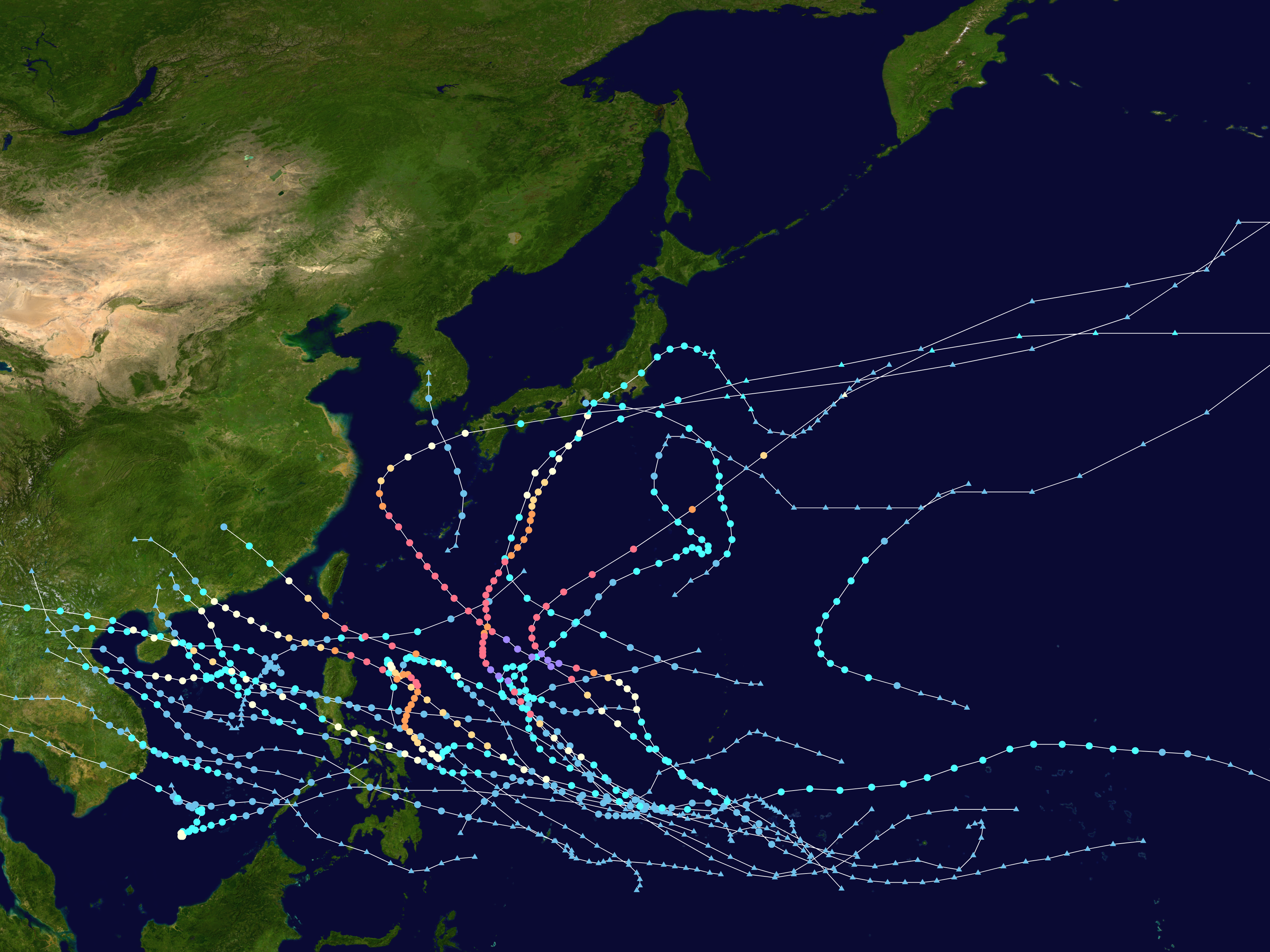
- Season summary map

Seasonal boundaries
- First system formed: June 8, 1983 (record latest)
- Last system dissipated: December 20, 1983

Strongest storm
- Name: Forrest
  - Maximum winds: 205 km/h (125 mph) (10-minute sustained)
  - Lowest pressure: 876 hPa (mbar)

Seasonal statistics
- Total depressions: 32
- Total storms: 23
- Typhoons: 10
- Very strong typhoons: 6
- Violent typhoons: 6
- Total fatalities: >1,154 total
- Total damage: > $397 million (1983 USD)

Related articles
- 1983 Atlantic hurricane season; 1983 Pacific hurricane season; 1983 North Indian Ocean cyclone season

The 1983 Pacific typhoon season was the latest start for a Pacific typhoon season on record, and also slightly below-average in terms of named storms. It ran year-round in 1983, but all tropical cyclones formed between June and November. These dates conventionally delimit the period of each year when most tropical cyclones form in the northwestern Pacific Ocean. A total of 32 tropical depressions formed this year, of which only 23 became tropical storms and were assigned a name by the Joint Typhoon Warning Center. Additionally, tropical depressions that enter or form in the Philippine area of responsibility are assigned a name by the Philippine Atmospheric, Geophysical and Astronomical Services Administration or PAGASA. This can often result in the same storm having two names. This year, a total of 23 storms were named this way.

The season had a late start, as the first system did not form until early June for the first time since 1973. The last tropical cyclone dissipated in mid-December. Of the 23 tropical storms, one formed in June, three formed in July, five formed in August, two formed in September, six formed in October, five formed in November, and one formed in December. Ten storms reached typhoon intensity according to the Japan Meteorological Agency, of which four reached super typhoon strength. Fifteen of the tropical cyclones made landfall, with six moving through the Philippines, six striking China, six moving into Vietnam, and three moving in Japan. Vera, Wayne, Kim, and Lex led to over half of the fatalities from tropical cyclones this season. Forrest became the fastest-developing tropical cyclone on record for the western Pacific Ocean, with a pressure drop of 92 hectopascals (2.7 inHg) in a 24‑hour period.

The scope of this article is limited to the Pacific Ocean to the north of the equator between 100°E and 180th meridian. Within the northwestern Pacific Ocean, there are two separate agencies that assign names to tropical cyclones which can often result in a cyclone having two names. The Japan Meteorological Agency (JMA) (Note: The Japan Meteorological Agency is the official Regional Specialized Meteorological Center for the western Pacific Ocean.) will name a tropical cyclone if it has 10-minute sustained wind speeds of at least 65 km/h (40 mph) anywhere in the basin. The Philippine Atmospheric, Geophysical and Astronomical Services Administration (PAGASA) assigns names to tropical cyclones which move into or form as a tropical depression in the Philippine Area of Responsibility (PAR), located between 135°E and 115°E and between 5°N–25°N, regardless of whether or not a tropical cyclone has already been given a name by the JMA. Tropical depressions that are monitored by the United States' Joint Typhoon Warning Center (JTWC) (Note: The Joint Typhoon Warning Center is a joint United States Navy – United States Air Force task force that issues tropical cyclone warnings for the western Pacific Ocean and other regions.) (Note: A super typhoon is an unofficial category used by the Joint Typhoon Warning Center (JTWC) for a typhoon with winds of at least 240 km/h (150 mph).) are given a number with a "W" suffix.

== Season summary ==
The season had a late start, as the first system did not form until late June for the first time since 1973. The last tropical cyclone dissipated in mid-December. A total of 26 tropical depressions formed this year in the Western Pacific, of which 23 became tropical storms. Of the 26 tropical cyclones, one formed in June, three formed in July, six formed in August, three formed in September, seven formed in October, five formed in November, and two formed in December. Ten storms reached typhoon intensity, of which four reached super typhoon strength. The activity of the season was reflected with an ACE of 220 units. Fifteen of the tropical cyclones made landfall, with six moving through the Philippines, six striking China, six moving into Vietnam, and three moving in Japan. Tropical cyclones accounted for 24 percent of the annual rainfall in Hong Kong this season.

Wayne formed east of the Philippines, becoming the first super typhoon of the season before striking mainland China on July 25. Abby was a long-lived system, forming near Guam and remaining an intense typhoon for a number of days before recurving into Japan as a weakening tropical storm on August 17. Ellen was a strong typhoon which tracked from the International Dateline westward near the northern Philippines and mainland China by September 9. Forrest formed well east of the Philippines in late September, becoming the fastest-developing tropical cyclone on record for the western Pacific Ocean, with a pressure drop of 92 hectopascals (2.7 inHg) in a 24‑hour period. Marge was an intense typhoon which recurved well off the coast of Asia during the first week of November. Orchid was a long-lived and erratic tropical cyclone which moved slowly just east of the Philippines during late November, absorbing Percy along the way. Vera, Wayne, Kim, and Lex led to over half of the fatalities from tropical cyclones this season.

== Systems ==
=== Tropical Storm Sarah ===
- Tropical storm (JMA)
- Tropical storm (SSHWS)
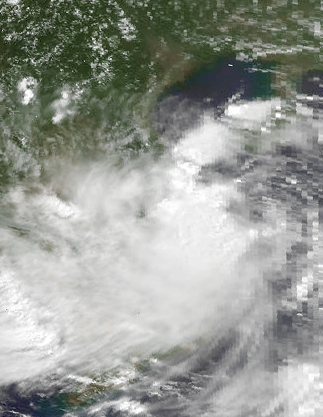
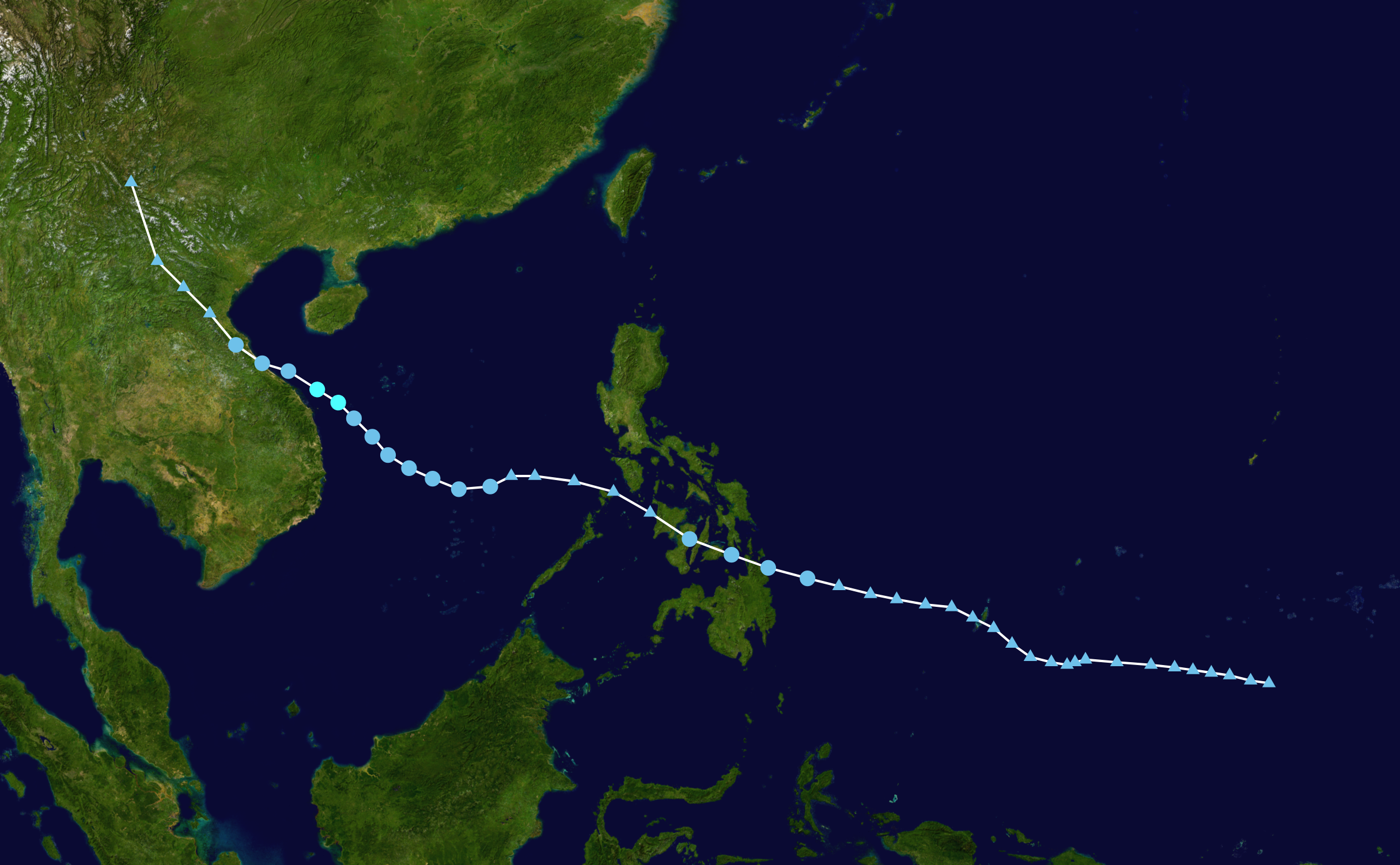
- Duration: June 24 – June 27
- Peak intensity: 65 km/h (40 mph) (10-min); 998 hPa (mbar)

When Tropical Storm Sarah formed in the South China Sea on June 24, it became the latest start of a western Pacific season since 1973. The initial tropical disturbance formed south of Guam on June 16. By June 19, a low level circulation formed as the system moved westward. As a tropical disturbance, the low crossed the Philippines with light winds. The system finally organized into a tropical depression and then a tropical storm on June 25. Sarah moved west-northwestward across the South China Sea, striking Central Vietnam before dissipating on June 26. Damage across the Philippines totaled 2.77 billion Philippine Pesos (1983 pesos), or US$249.3 million (1983 dollars).

=== Typhoon Tip (Auring) ===
- Typhoon (JMA)
- Category 1 typhoon (SSHWS)
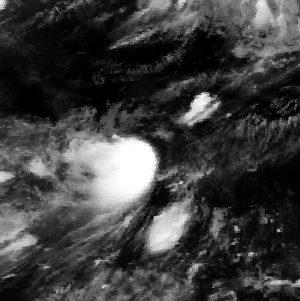
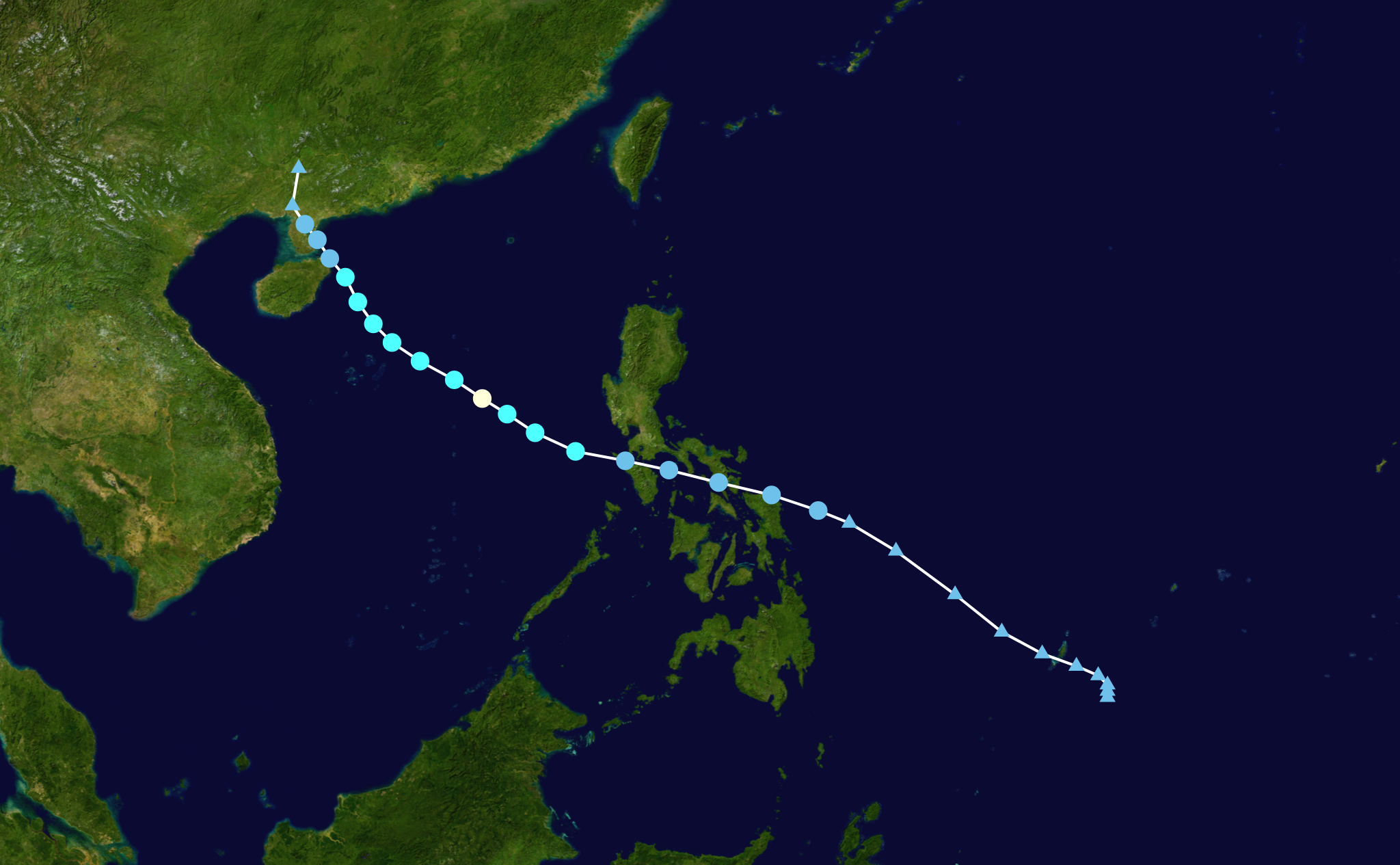
- Duration: July 10 – July 14
- Peak intensity: 120 km/h (75 mph) (10-min); 975 hPa (mbar)

A tropical disturbance first noted east of the Philippines, the system moved through the archipelago as a tropical depression before strengthening briefly to a typhoon in the South China Sea. A combination of northeasterly vertical wind shear and proximity to land weakened the cyclone to a tropical storm before its landfall on Hai-nan and struck Chan Chiang, China as a tropical depression. Winds peaked at 34 knots (63 km/h) at Tate's Cairn in Hong Kong.

=== Typhoon Vera (Bebeng) ===
- Typhoon (JMA)
- Category 2 typhoon (SSHWS)
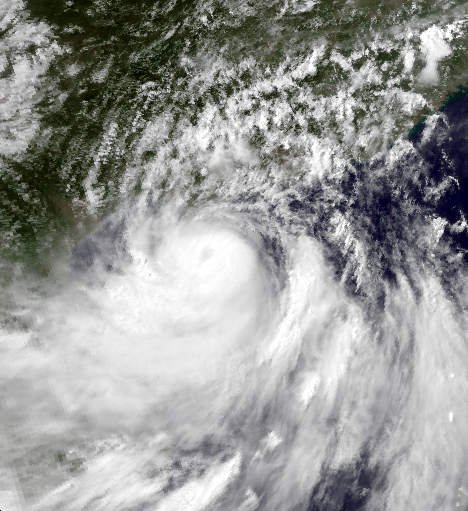
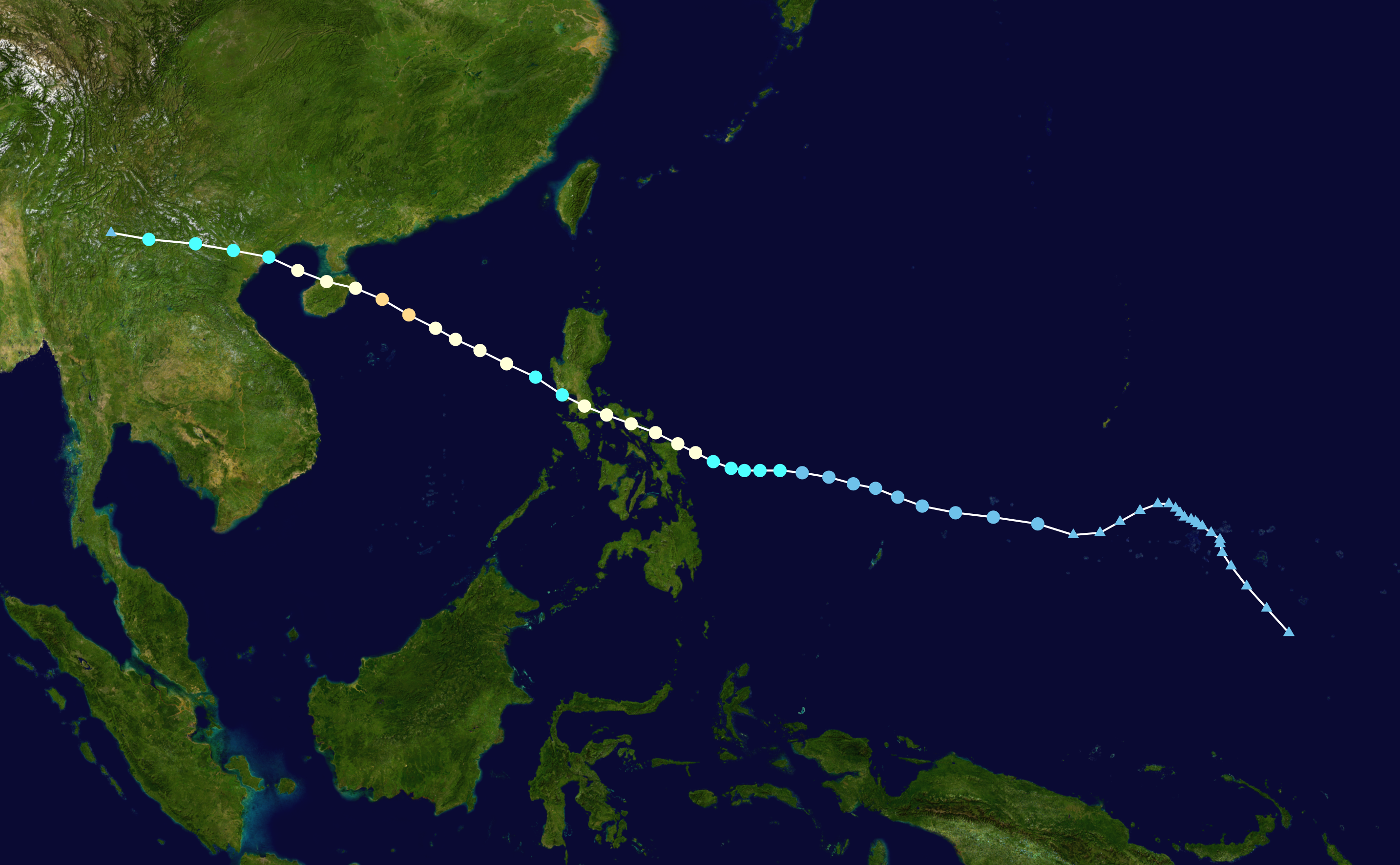
- Duration: July 10 – July 19
- Peak intensity: 140 km/h (85 mph) (10-min); 965 hPa (mbar)

The monsoon trough spawned a tropical depression on July 12, east of the Philippines. It headed westward, strengthening to a tropical storm that night and a typhoon on the 13th. Vera made landfall on the 14th as an 85 mph (137 km/h) typhoon in the Philippines, weakened over the islands, and restrengthened over the South China Sea to a 100 mph (160 km/h) typhoon. Damage totaled US$9 million in the Philippines. In Hong Kong, winds peaked at 60 knots (110 km/h) at Tate's Cairn. Vera struck Hainan Island on the 17th, crossed the Gulf of Tonkin, and made landfall near Haiphong, Vietnam on the 18th. Vera brought torrential flooding, resulting in the deaths of 106 people.

=== Typhoon Wayne (Katring) ===
- Violent typhoon (JMA)
- Category 4 super typhoon (SSHWS)
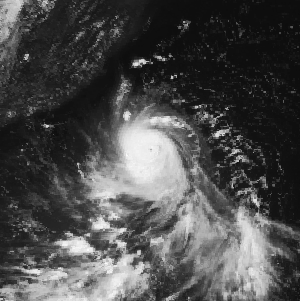
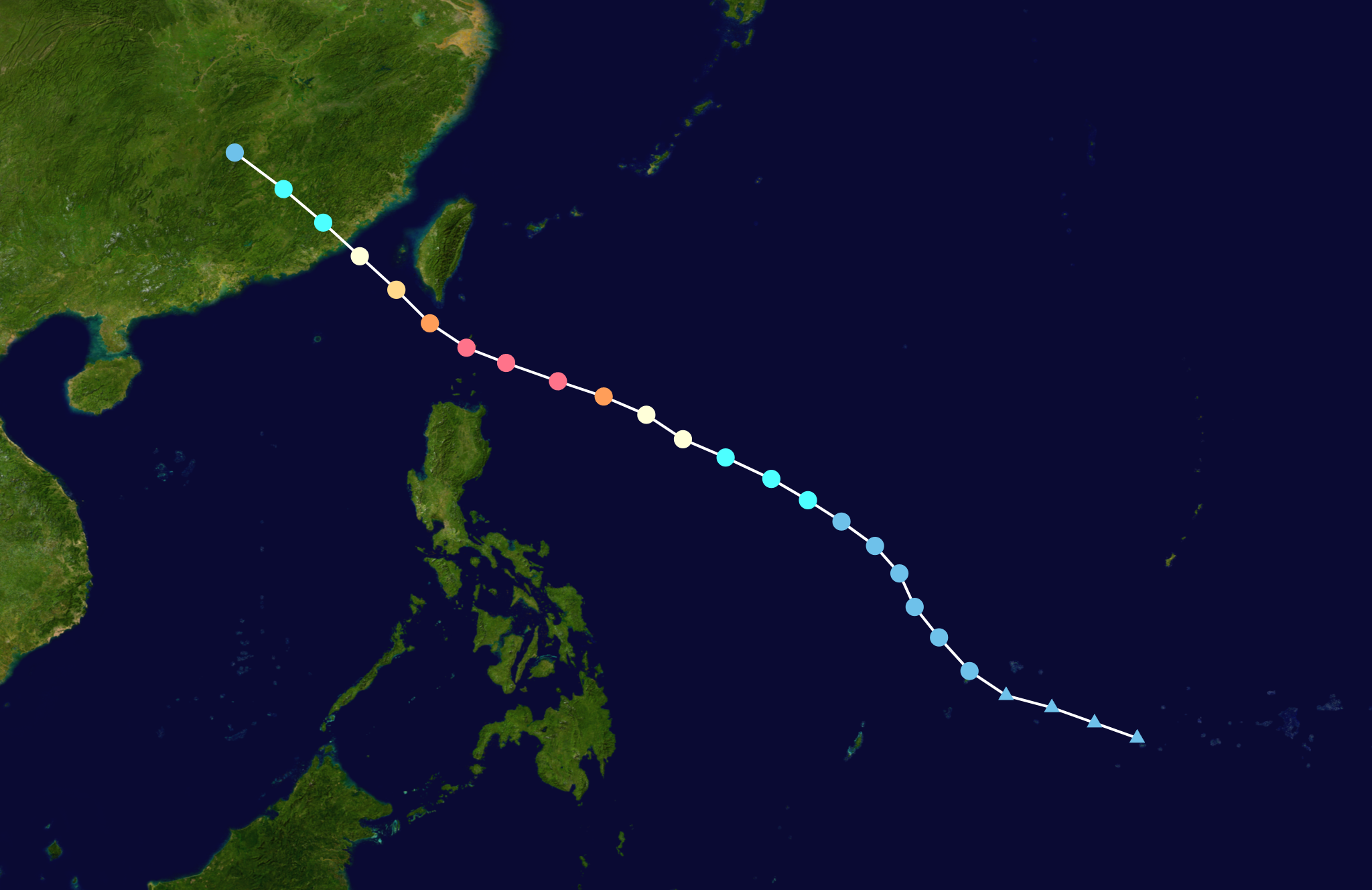
- Duration: July 22 – July 26
- Peak intensity: 205 km/h (125 mph) (10-min); 920 hPa (mbar)

Becoming a tropical depression east of the Philippines, Wayne strengthened rapidly to become a tropical storm on July 22, a typhoon on July 23, and a super typhoon around midday on July 24 before moving south of Taiwan into mainland China on July 25 and dissipating. In the Philippines, 20 perished due to flash flooding. Wayne was the fifth most intense tropical cyclone to impact Fujian between 1960 and 2005. Heavy rainfall led to severe flooding in Fujian and Guangdong. The total death toll reached 105.

=== Typhoon Abby (Diding) ===
- Violent typhoon (JMA)
- Category 5 super typhoon (SSHWS)
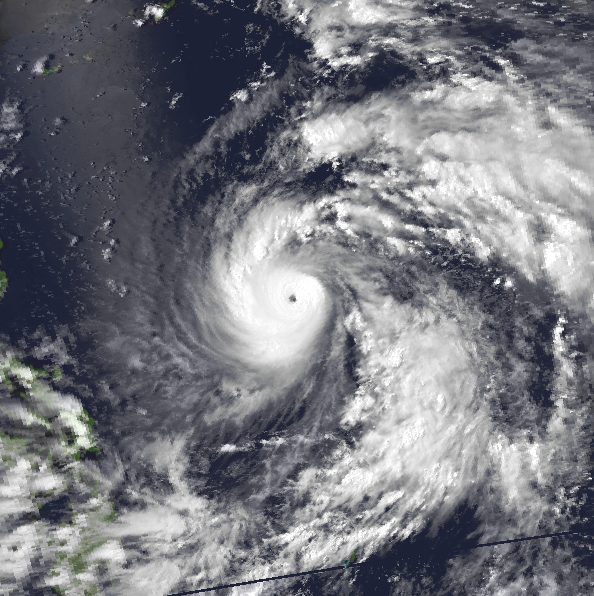
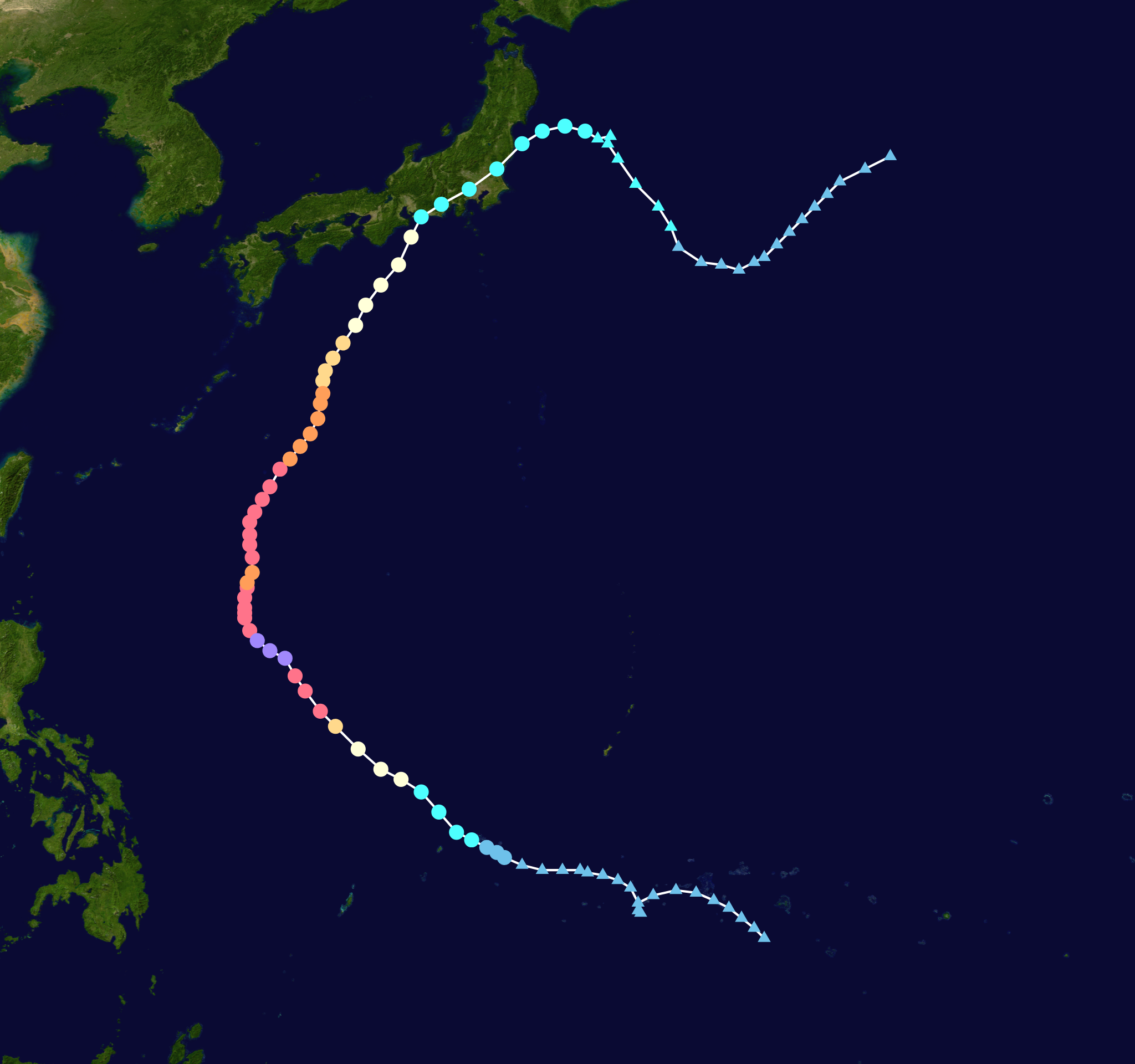
- Duration: August 4 – August 18
- Peak intensity: 230 km/h (145 mph) (10-min); 895 hPa (mbar)

First noted southeast of Guam on July 31, this system slowly matured into the season's second super typhoon as it moved west-northwest over the following nine days. Intensification was most rapid as it was slowly recurving northward on August 7 and August 8. After peaking early on August 9, Abby slowly weakened as it interacted with the main belt of the Westerlies. It managed to remain a major typhoon, with winds at or above 100 knots (190 km/h), for a week. Abby finally weakened back into a tropical storm on August 17 just before its landfall at Hamamatsu, Japan. By late that night, Abby completed the transition to an extratropical cyclone after moving through central Japan. Two perished from Abby in Japan. Its deluge led to numerous landslides and the destruction of 19 bridges. Commercial traffic by land, sea, and air was also paralyzed by the cyclone.

=== Tropical Storm Carmen (Etang) ===
- Tropical storm (JMA)
- Tropical storm (SSHWS)
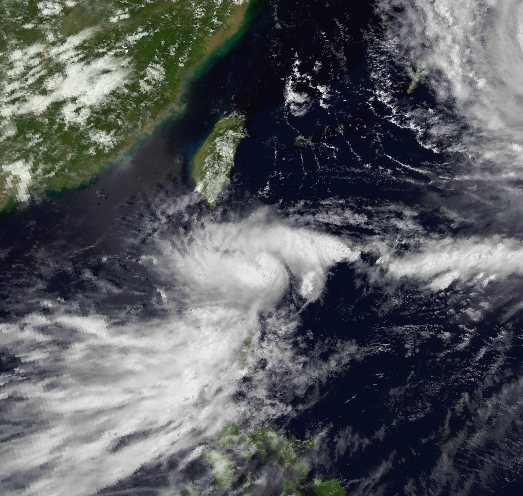
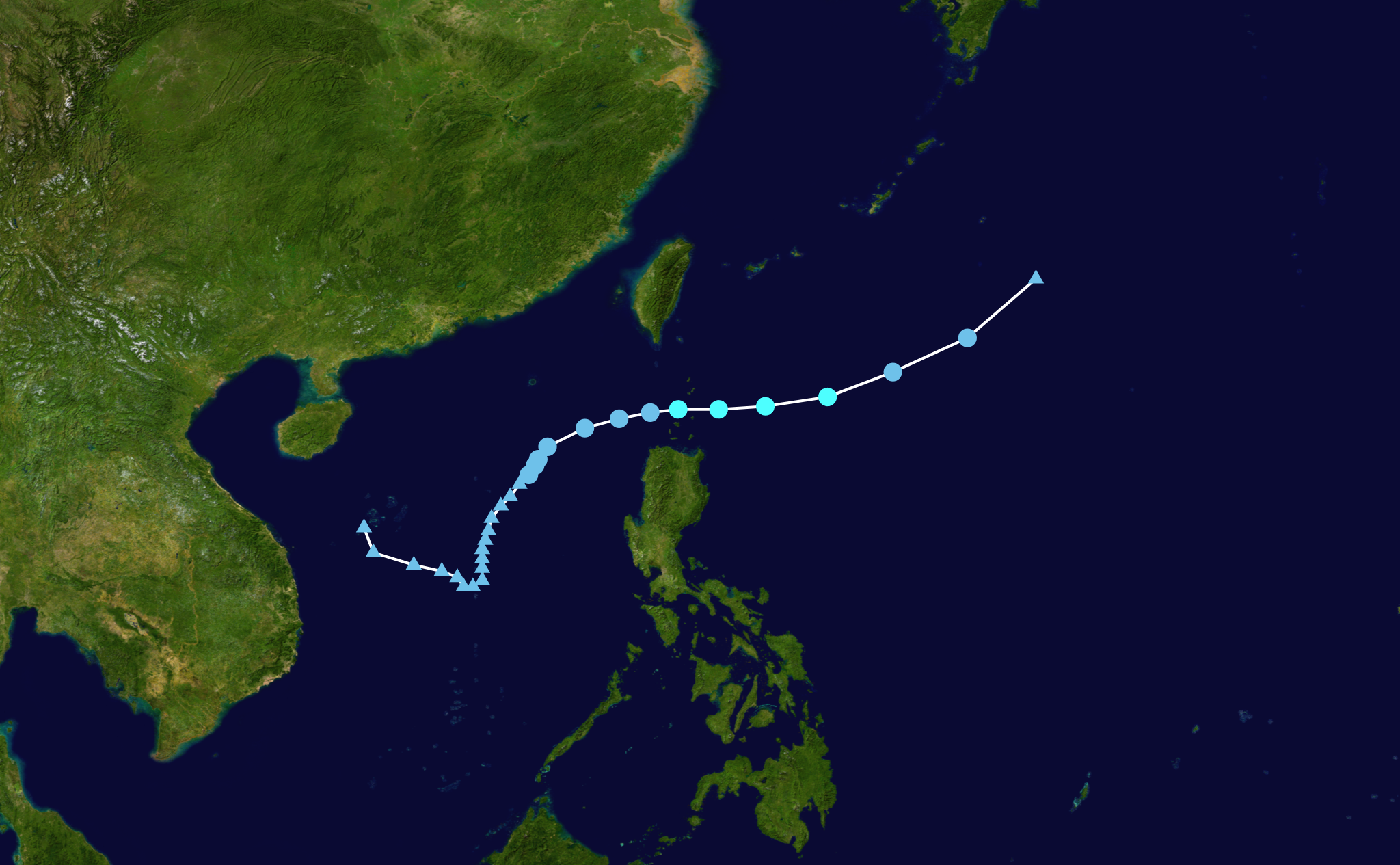
- Duration: August 9 – August 15
- Peak intensity: 75 km/h (45 mph) (10-min); 992 hPa (mbar)

Originating in the monsoon trough in the South China Sea in early August, a low level circulation was first spotted about 370 km east of Vietnam on August 8. Slow development ensued, and the system became a tropical depression during the night of August 12. Tracking slowly north-northeast, Carmen began to accelerate to the east-northeast towards the Luzon Strait, steered by Abby. This acceleration was likely a redevelopment of the low-pressure area downshear. The system became a tropical storm early morning of August 14 as it continued to close the distance to Abby. By late morning on August 15, absorption into Abby was complete.

=== Severe Tropical Storm Ben ===
- Severe tropical storm (JMA)
- Tropical storm (SSHWS)
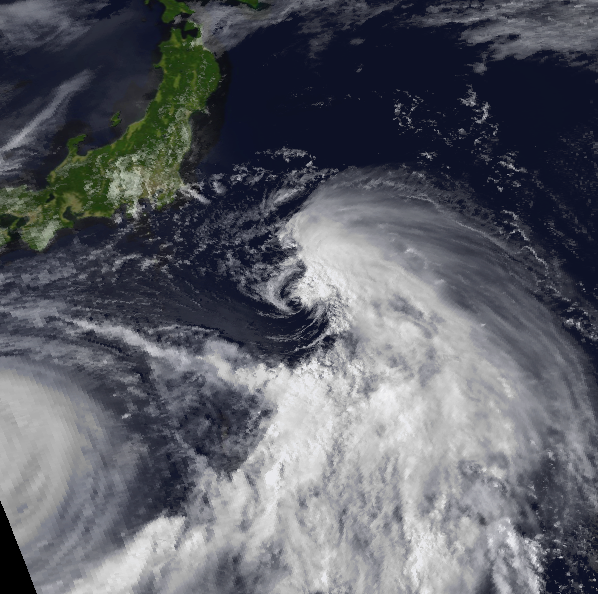
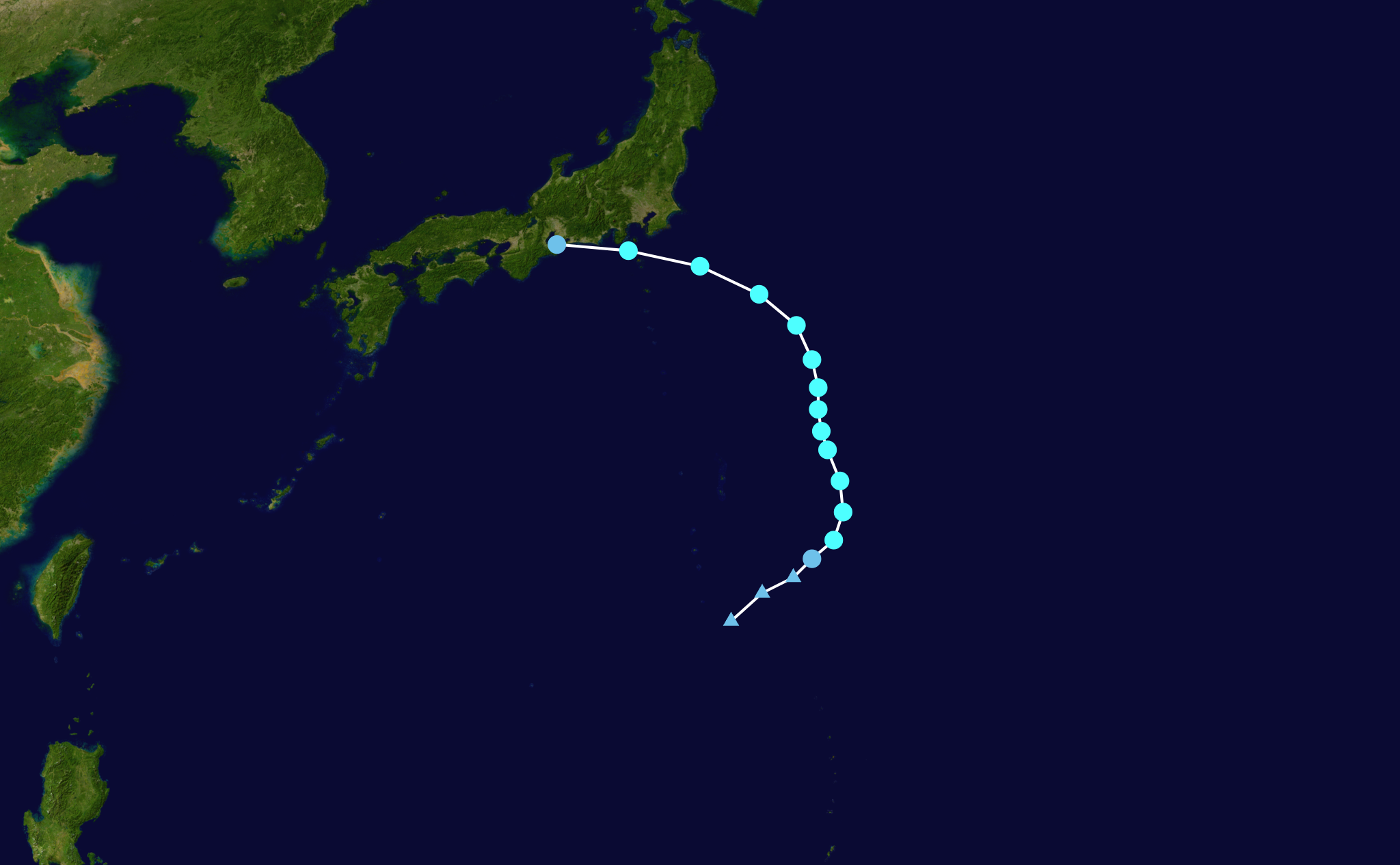
- Duration: August 11 – August 15
- Peak intensity: 100 km/h (65 mph) (10-min); 985 hPa (mbar)

An area of strong thunderstorms formed east of Abby, developing a low level center on August 12 on the western side of the thunderstorm activity, due to westerly vertical wind shear from nearby Abby. It developed into a tropical storm that night and moved northwest due to Abby's influence on the steering across the western Pacific at that time. Turning to the west, Ben moved along the southern coast of Honshū and made landfall west of Hamamatsu. Due to land interaction and increasing upper level westerly wind shear, Ben became an exposed low level circulation on August 14 in the Sea of Japan, eventually dissipating late on August 15.

=== Tropical Storm Dom (Gening) ===
- Tropical storm (JMA)
- Tropical storm (SSHWS)
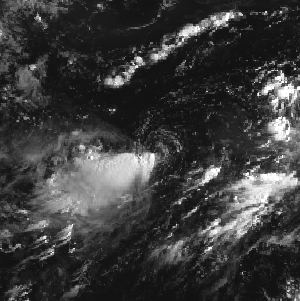
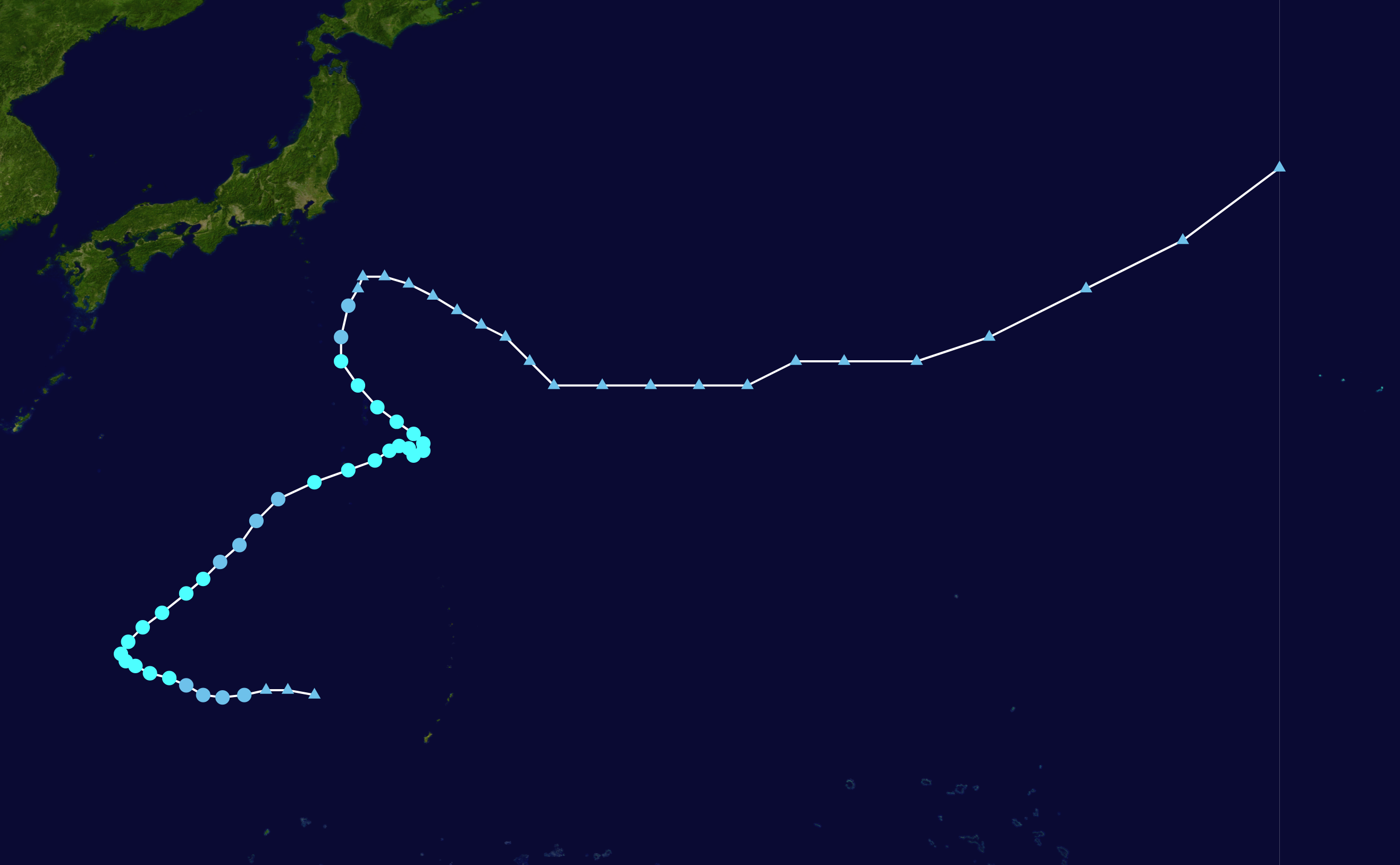
- Duration: August 18 – August 28
- Peak intensity: 75 km/h (45 mph) (10-min); 996 hPa (mbar)

On August 17, a tropical disturbance was noted west of Guam. Slow development ensued, and the system became a tropical storm late on August 19. As a deep cyclone near Japan linked up with the monsoon trough, the cyclone turned sharply northeast on August 20. Persisitently sheared by strong northeasterly flow aloft initially, once Dom recurved its convection was left completely behind, weakening the system to a tropical depression on August 21. Thunderstorms began to redevelop near the center, and by midday on August 23 Dom was a tropical storm once more. At this point Dom was moving erratically as the trough near Japan moved off to the east, and by August 24 Dom turned back to the north-northwest. By August 25 strong winds aloft weakened Dom once more, and the cyclone dissipated as a tropical cyclone on August 26.

=== Tropical Depression 09W ===
- Tropical depression (JMA)
- Tropical depression (SSHWS)
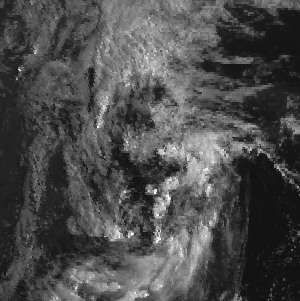
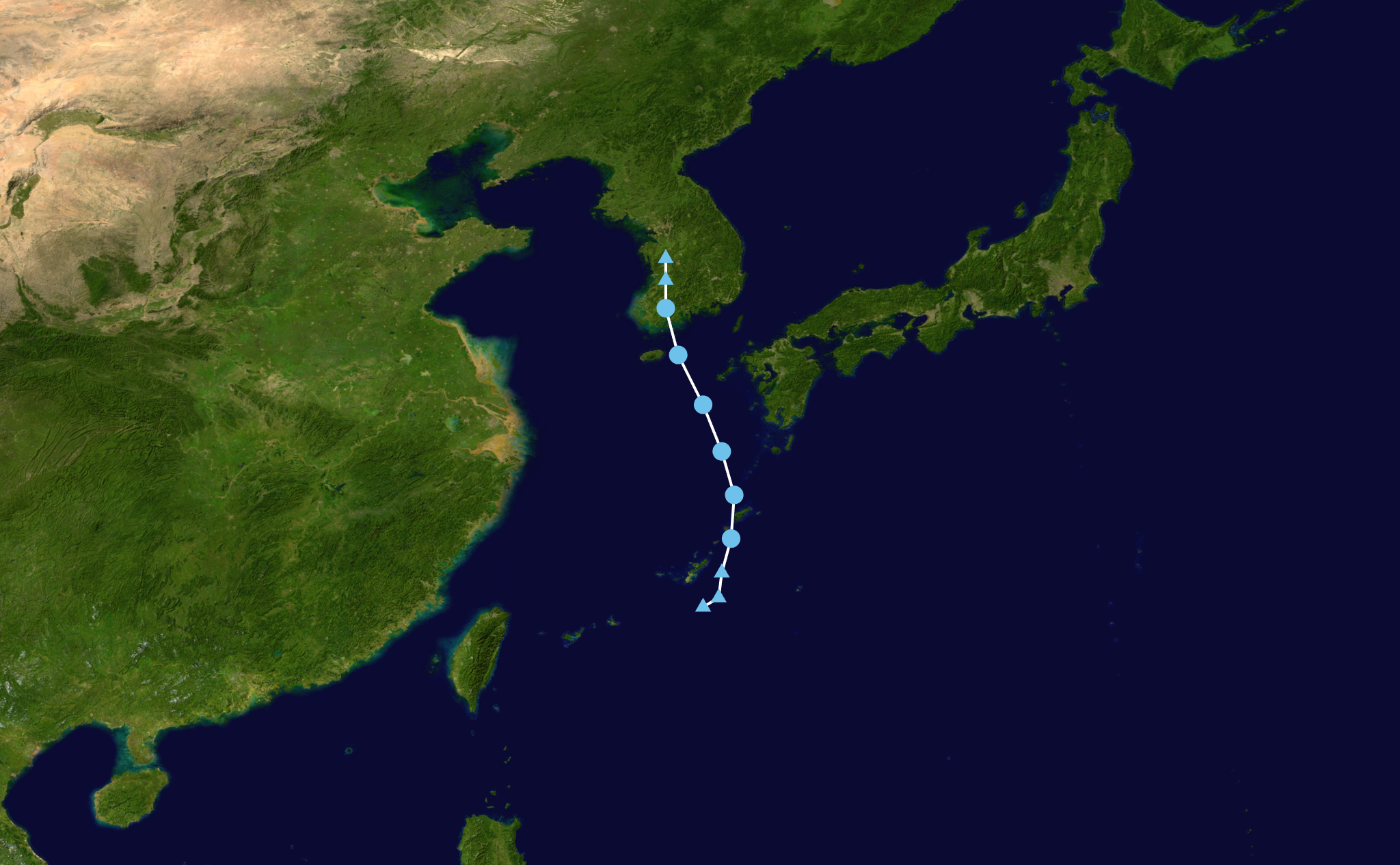
- Duration: August 25 – August 27
- Peak intensity: 55 km/h (35 mph) (10-min); 998 hPa (mbar)

This system formed well north of the normal climatological position to the west of Dom, as the monsoon trough was similarly displaced. It was first noted on August 25, but showed no further development. Thunderstorms were located about 300 miles (480 km) south of the center, but since the central pressure was under 1000 mb, it was considered a tropical depression while an exposed low level swirl. The system did develop some central convection, and moved northward into South Korea, bringing showers to the region, and dissipated late on August 27.

=== Typhoon Ellen (Herming) ===
- Violent typhoon (JMA)
- Category 4 typhoon (SSHWS)
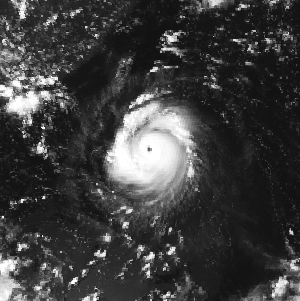
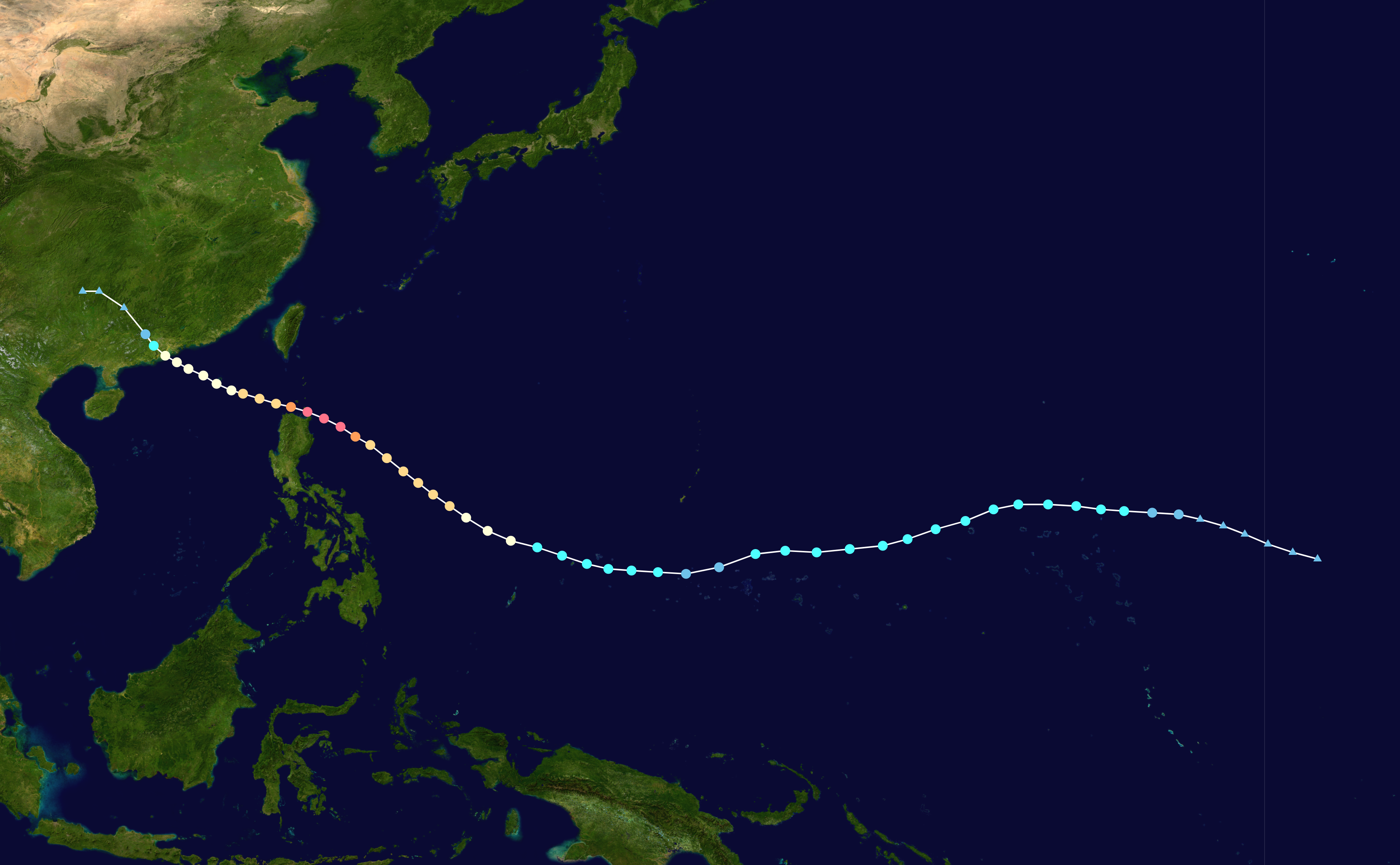
- Duration: August 28 – September 10
- Peak intensity: 205 km/h (125 mph) (10-min); 925 hPa (mbar)

It was first noted as a tropical disturbance east of the International Dateline on August 26, and became a tropical storm soon after crossing in the dateline on the morning of August 29. A strong high pressure ridge offshore Japan led to no further development over the next 5 days, and the cyclone began to track south of west. Dropping down to a weak tropical depression late on September 1, conditions aloft finally improved and the cyclone strengthened into a typhoon on September 3 as it tracked west-northwest. Approaching Luzon late on September 5, Ellen intensified rapidly into a strong typhoon before the terrain began to weaken the cyclone. Its final landfall was at Macau on the morning of September 9 as a minor typhoon.

Hong Kong experienced extensive damage, with six killed and 277 injured. Winds gusted to 134 knots (248 km/h) at Stanley. Twenty-two ships ran aground in the harbor. Rainfall totaled 231.8 millimetres (9.13 in) at Hong Kong's Royal Observatory. The second tornado ever recorded in Hong Kong, and the first during a typhoon passage, occurred during Ellen. Ellen was Hong Kong's worst typhoon since Typhoon Hope of 1979. By late on the 9th, Ellen was rapidly dissipating in mainland China.

=== Tropical Depression 02C ===
- Tropical depression (SSHWS)
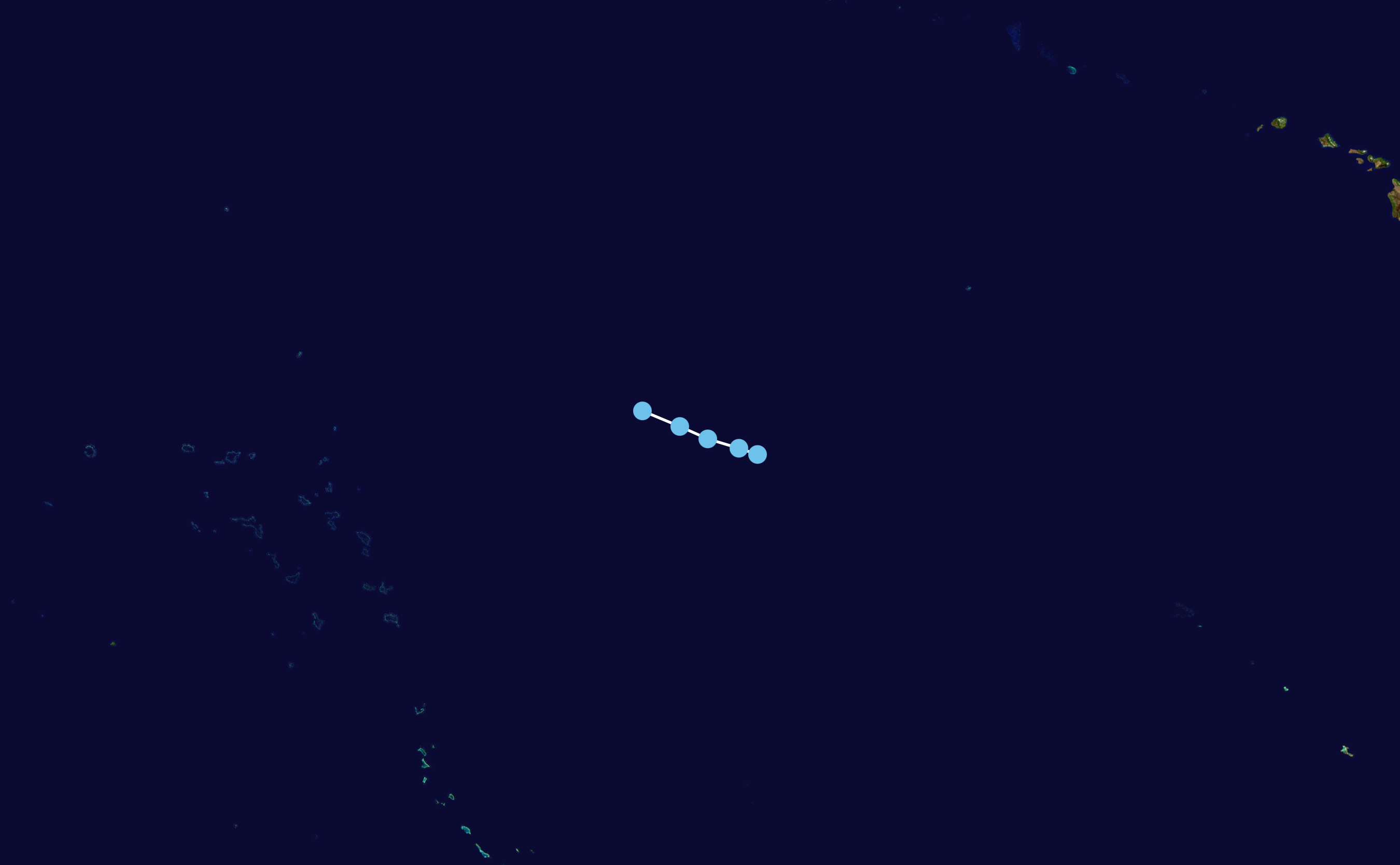
- Duration: September 1 (entered basin) – September 4
- Peak intensity: 55 km/h (35 mph) (1-min); 1008 hPa (mbar)

Tropical Depression 02C entered the basin and remained a weak system throughout its existence, Tropical Depression 02C had a windspeed of 55 km/h (35 mph) throughout its existence in the Pacific, Tropical Depression 02C formed on September 1 and later dissipating on September 4th.

=== Typhoon Forrest (Ising) ===
- Violent typhoon (JMA)
- Category 5 super typhoon (SSHWS)
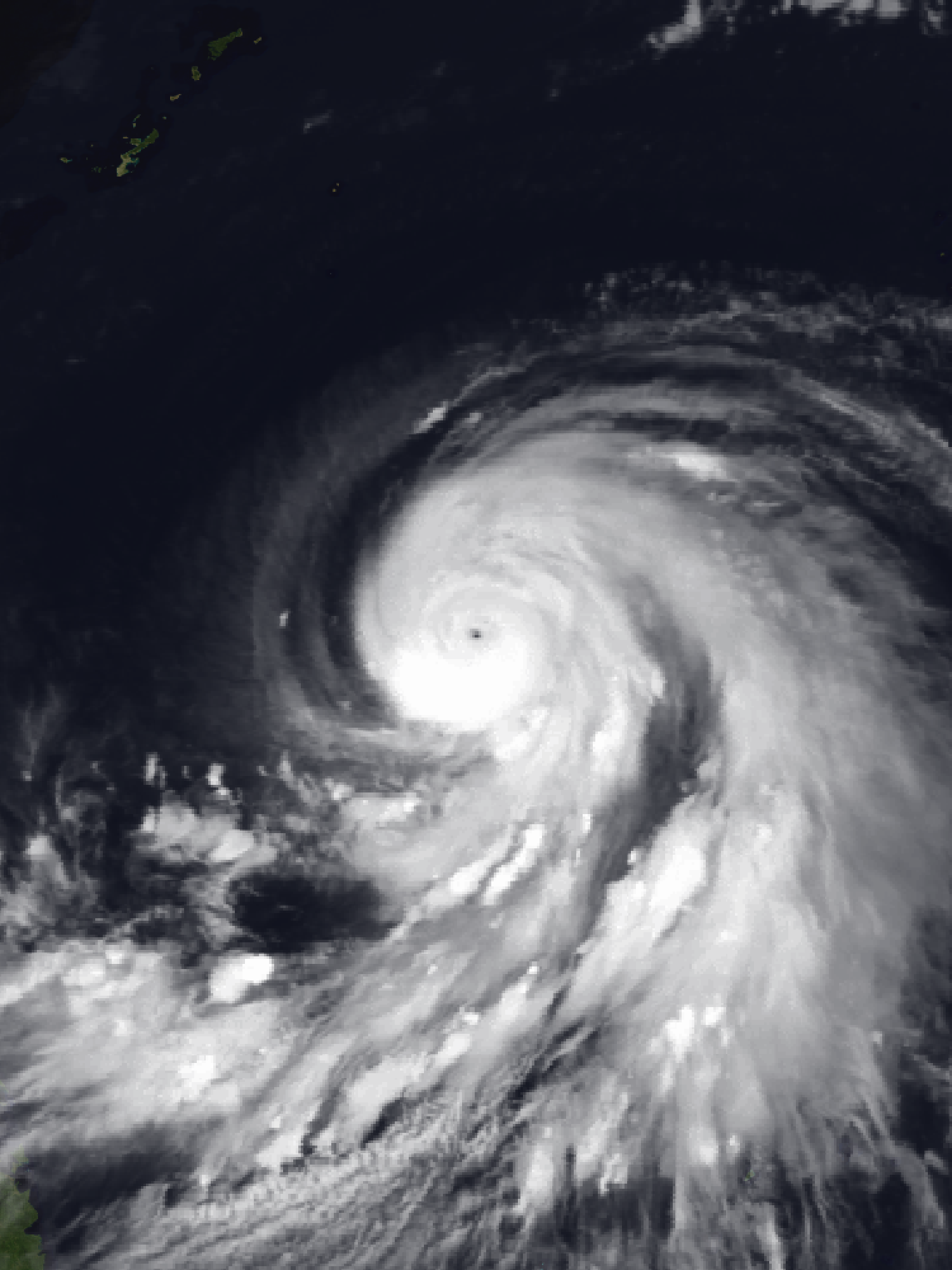
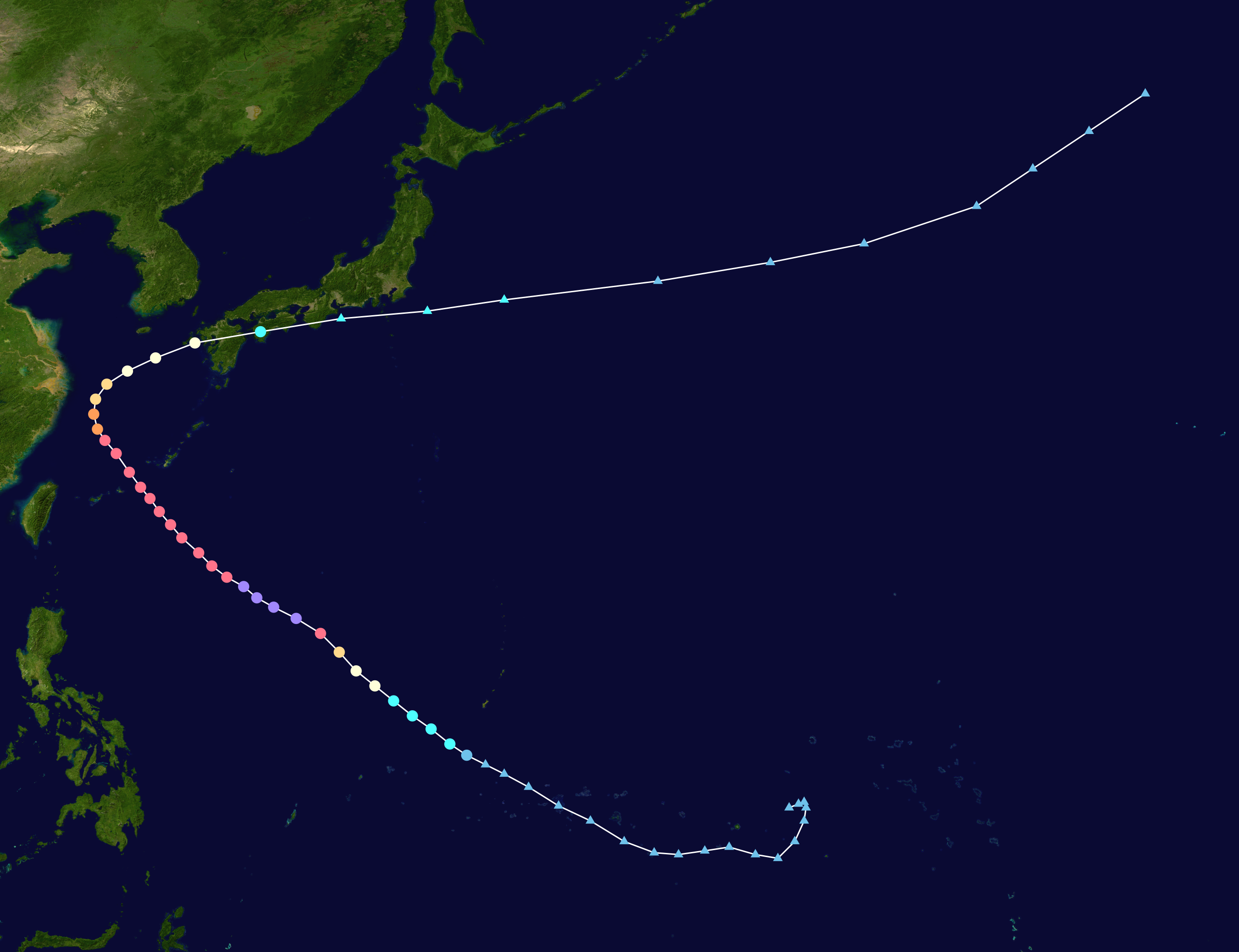
- Duration: September 19 – September 29
- Peak intensity: 205 km/h (125 mph) (10-min); 876 hPa (mbar)

Super Typhoon Forrest developed in the Western Pacific Ocean in September over the open ocean. It was the fastest-developing tropical cyclone on record, with a pressure drop of 100 mbar in a 24‑hour period, reaching a minimum pressure of 876 millibars (25.9 inHg) at peak intensity. A tornado struck Inza Island, destroying 26 homes and injuring 26 people, as the cyclone passed by Okinawa. Forrest struck Japan as a tropical storm on the 28th. Kadena Air Force base reported winds gusting to 74 knots (137 km/h) and rainfall totaling 300 millimetres (12 in) during Forrest's passage. Up to 483 millimetres (19.0 in) of rainfall fell across Japan, damaging 46,000 homes. Overall, the storm caused 21 casualties and ¥80.5 billion (USD526 million) in damage.

=== Typhoon Georgia (Luding) ===
- Typhoon (JMA)
- Tropical storm (SSHWS)
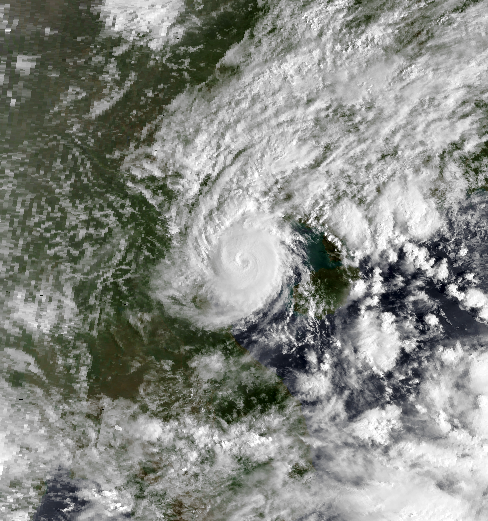
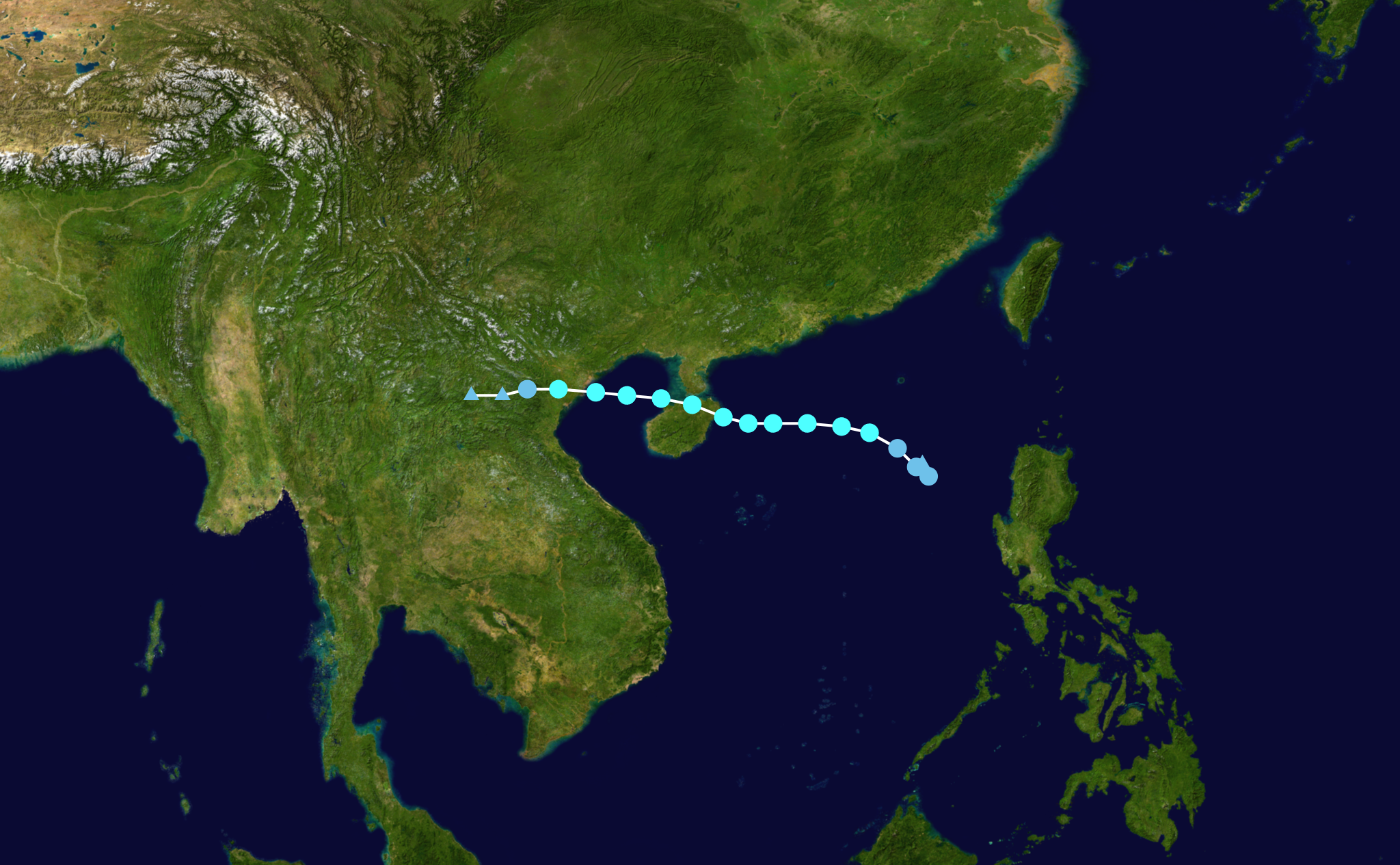
- Duration: September 27 – October 2
- Peak intensity: 130 km/h (80 mph) (10-min); 980 hPa (mbar)

A large area of thunderstorm activity formed west of the Philippines. Rapidly organizing on September 28, Georgia became a tropical storm by the next morning. Moving westward, it tracked across Hainan Island to the south of China. Wind gusts reached 60 knots (110 km/h) both at Tate's Cairn and Kowloon Tsai Hill in Hong Kong. Ultimately the storm made its final landfall in Hà Nam Ninh, Vietnam before dissipating while entering Laos. Georgia killed 26, damaged 7000 buildings, and led to a loss of 247,000 acres (1,000 km^{2}) of rice. The 13 to 14 inches (330 to 360 mm) of rainfall it brought to Vietnam relieved drought conditions.

=== Tropical Depression Mameng ===
- Tropical depression (JMA)
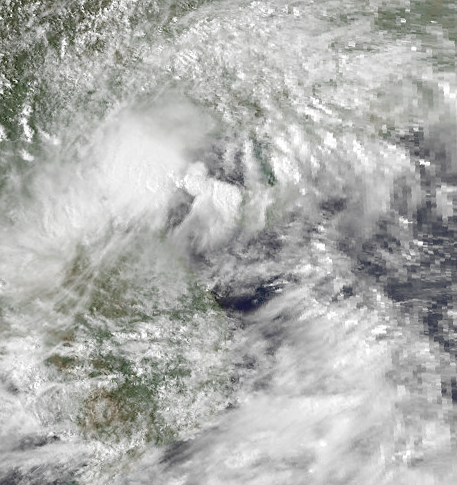
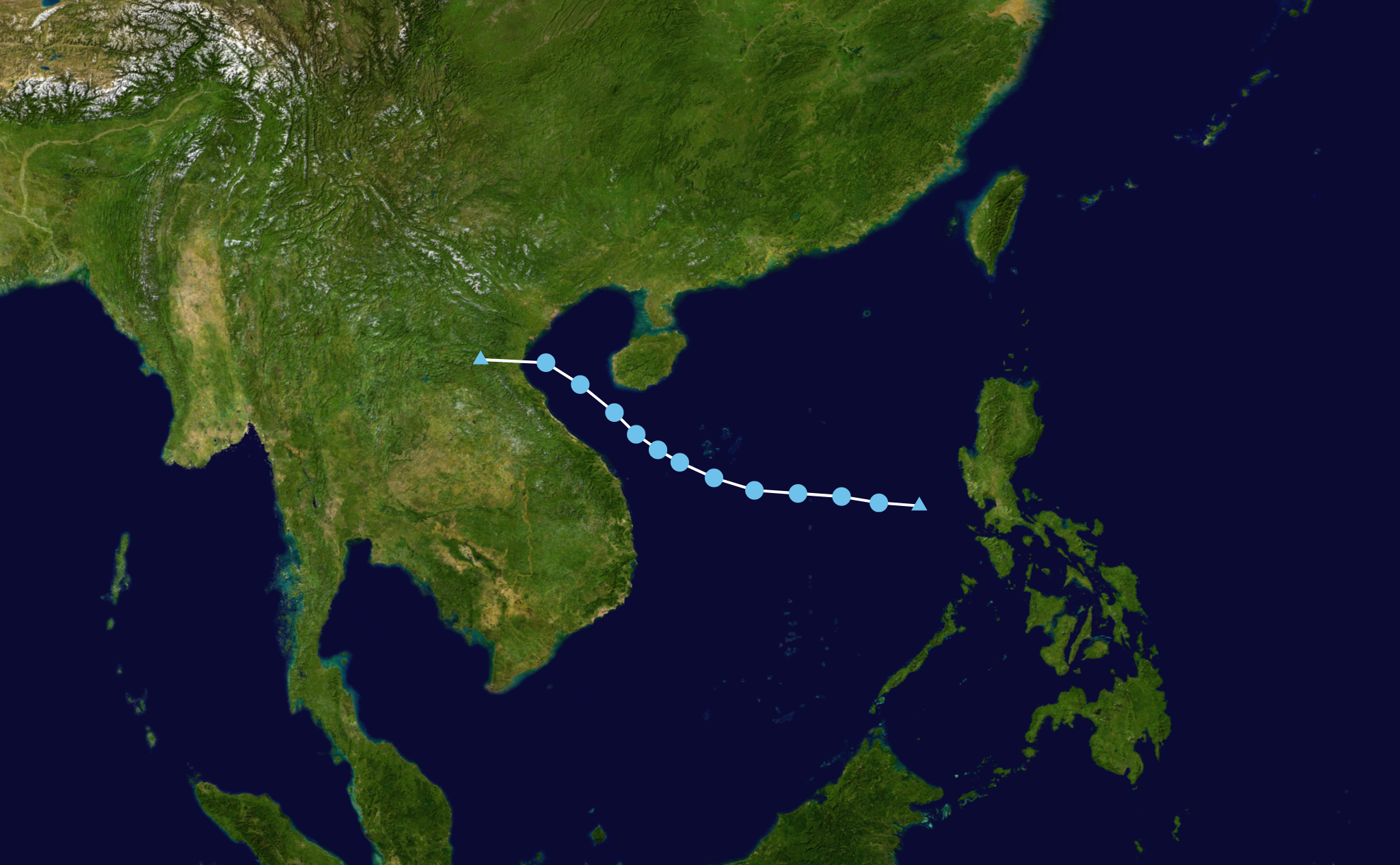
- Duration: September 29 – October 4
- Peak intensity: 55 km/h (35 mph) (10-min); 1000 hPa (mbar)

This system was recognized by the Hong Kong Royal Observatory, the JMA and PAGASA. A tropical depression formed in the South China Sea near Xisha Dao on October 2, and moved northwest, dissipating near Hanoi a couple days later.

=== Tropical Storm Herbert (Neneng) ===
- Tropical storm (JMA)
- Tropical storm (SSHWS)
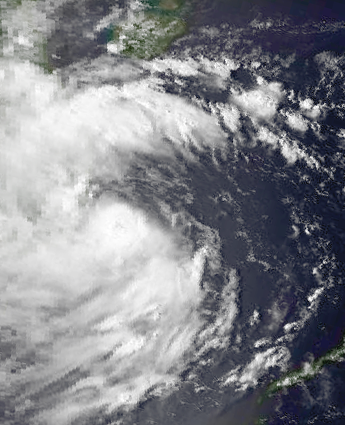
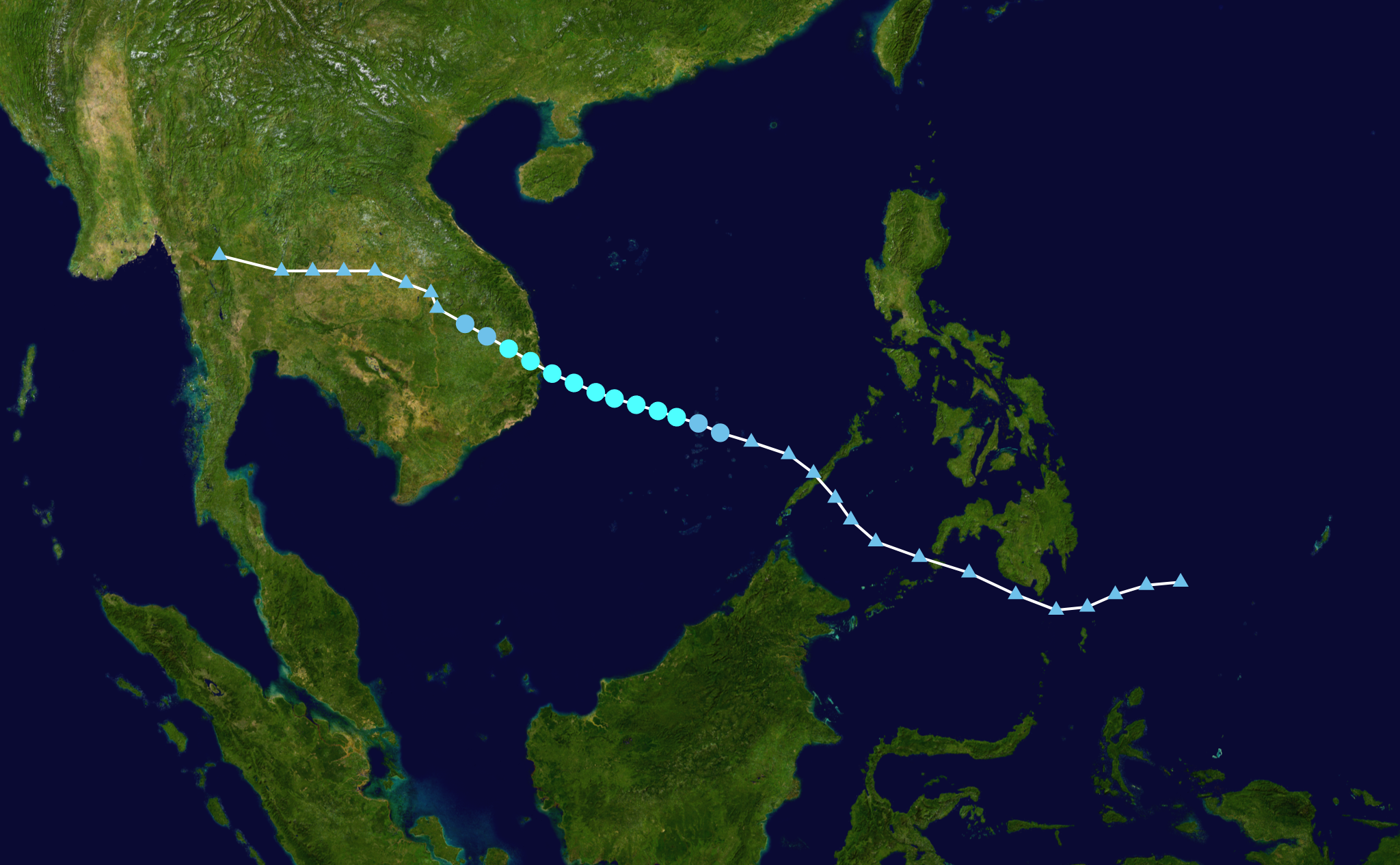
- Duration: October 3 – October 11 (exited basin)
- Peak intensity: 85 km/h (50 mph) (10-min); 995 hPa (mbar)

The initial disturbance was first spotted 250 miles (402 km) east of Mindanao. Moving westward for the next few days without development, the system moved into the South China Sea. The system became a tropical storm on October 7 to due significantly increased low-level southwesterlies spinning up its circulation. The cyclone then moved west-northwest, striking Nha Trang, Vietnam. The convective pattern was slow to fade as it drifted westward across Indochina over the next few days. Forty perished during this tropical cyclone.

=== Severe Tropical Storm Ida (Oniang) ===
- Severe tropical storm (JMA)
- Category 1 typhoon (SSHWS)
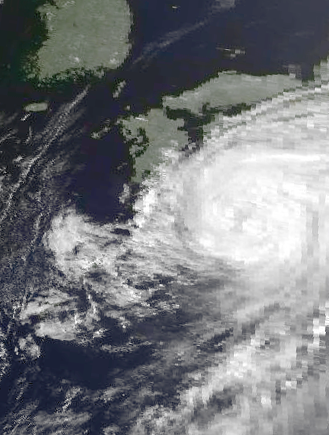
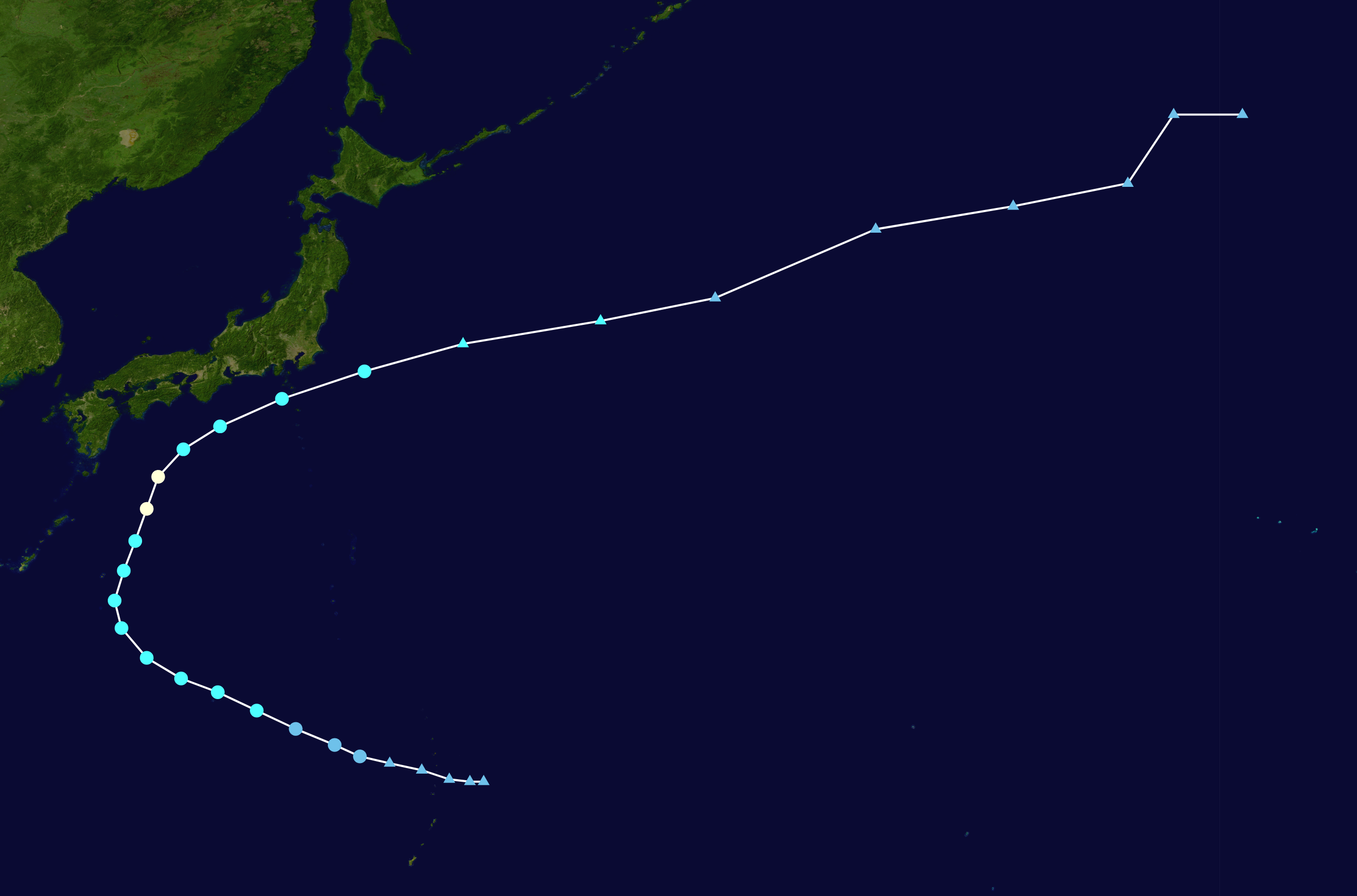
- Duration: October 7 – October 11
- Peak intensity: 110 km/h (70 mph) (10-min); 975 hPa (mbar)

An inverted trough appeared near Saipan on October 6, which appears to be linked with pre-existing convection within an upper-level cyclone, which appeared as early as October 3. By late on the 6th, a closed circulation formed. Continuing to develop, the system became a tropical depression on the morning of October 8 as it moved northwest. Becoming a typhoon on October 10 as it was recurving into the main belt of the Westerlies, the cyclone passed only 150 km southeast of Honshū. Since it was a small cyclone, no damage occurred within Japan. By late on October 11, Ida evolved into an extratropical cyclone which moved eastward through the northern Pacific.

=== Severe Tropical Storm Joe (Pepang) ===
- Severe tropical storm (JMA)
- Category 1 typhoon (SSHWS)
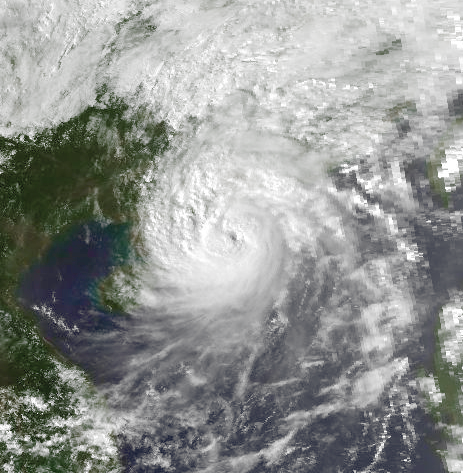
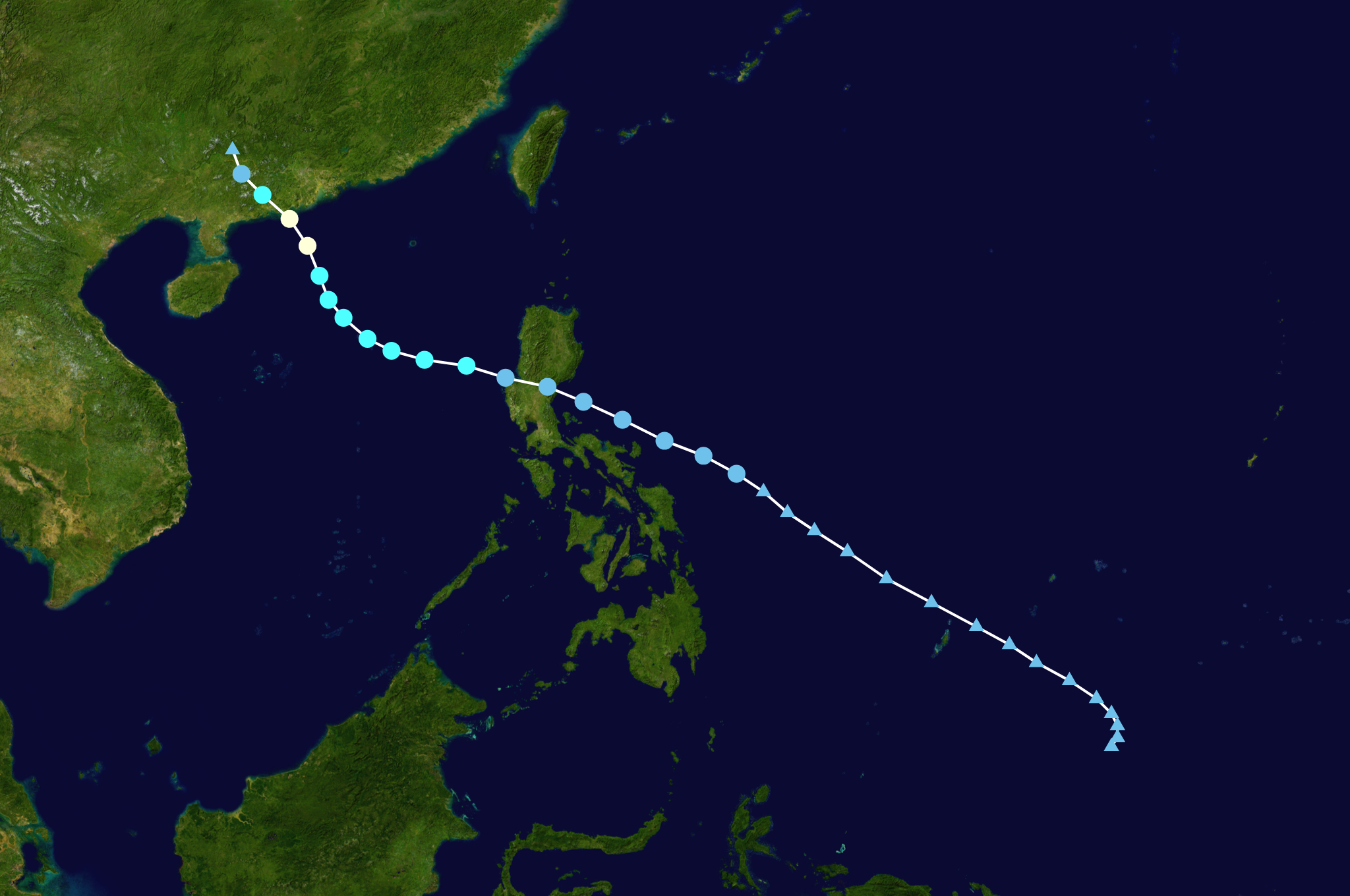
- Duration: October 9 – October 14
- Peak intensity: 100 km/h (65 mph) (10-min); 975 hPa (mbar)

One of three consecutive tropical cyclones to form in the South China Sea, the initial disturbance was first noted well south of Guam on October 6. The system moved westward, and developed a closed wind circulation by midday on October 9. A new center formed to the south, which complicated the system's development. Remaining poorly organized in the Philippine Sea due to northerly vertical wind shear, the tropical depression crossed central Luzon. Now in the South China Sea, the system became better organized and developed into a tropical storm and typhoon as it moved northwest. Soon after becoming a typhoon, Joe moved into southern China about 190 kilometres (120 mi) west of Hong Kong and quickly dissipated inland. Wind gusts reached 78 knots (144 km/h) at Tai O, while rainfall amounts of 183.9 millimetres (7.24 in) fell at Tate's Cairn.

=== Tropical Storm Kim (Rosing) ===
- Tropical storm (JMA)
- Tropical storm (SSHWS)
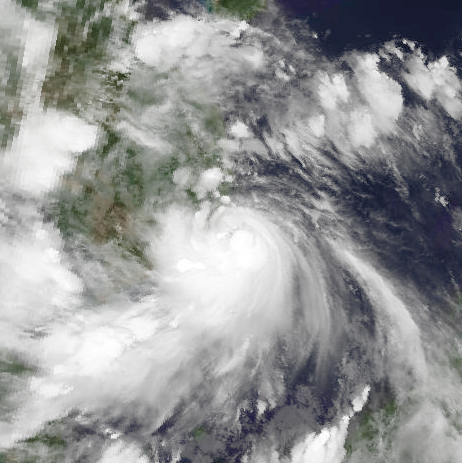
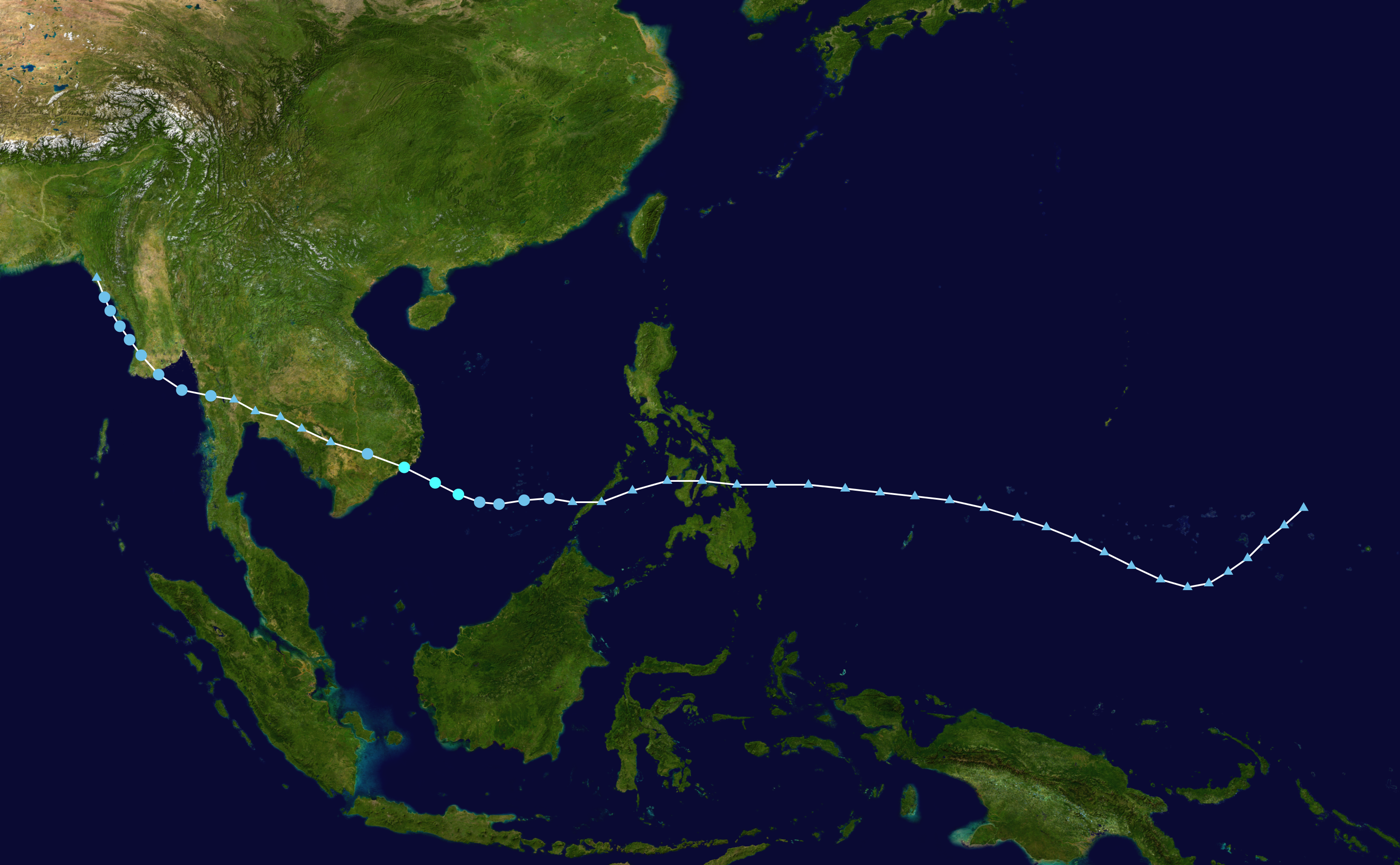
- Duration: October 15 – October 18 (Exited basin)
- Peak intensity: 75 km/h (45 mph) (10-min); 994 hPa (mbar)

Tropical Storm Kim, which formed in the South China Sea on October 14, hit southeastern Vietnam late on October 16. It weakened over land, but retained its circulation, and redeveloped into a tropical depression on October 19 in the northeastern Bay of Bengal in the North Indian Ocean. Kim continued northwestward, and dissipated on October 20 over Myanmar. Even though Tropical Storm Kim was a weak storm, its heavy rains caused serious flash flooding and mudslides in Vietnam and Thailand. In Vietnam, Tropical Storm Kim, also known as Typhoon No. 9 (Vietnamese: Cơn bão số 9) resulted in 176 deaths, 125 missing people, the collapse of nearly 40,000 houses, and the sinking of 983 boats and ships. In Thailand, already deluged by an earlier tropical storm, there was moderate flooding in Bangkok.

=== Severe Tropical Storm Lex (Sisang) ===
- Severe tropical storm (JMA)
- Category 1 typhoon (SSHWS)
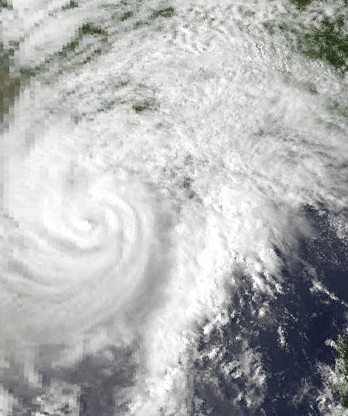
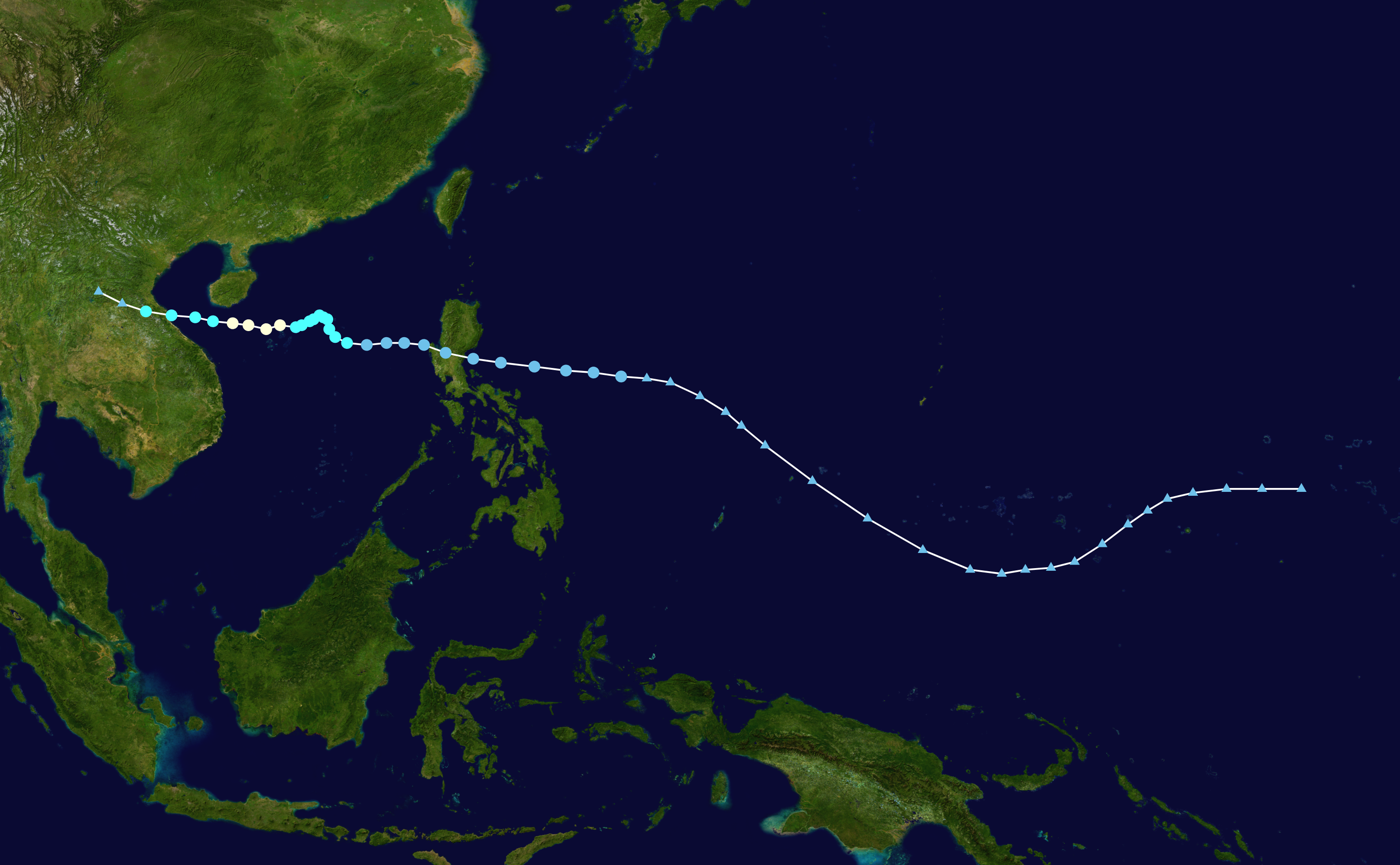
- Duration: October 19 – October 27
- Peak intensity: 95 km/h (60 mph) (10-min); 985 hPa (mbar)

First noted near the Marshall Islands on October 14, the tropical disturbance moved westward for the next couple of days without and further development. An upper-level ridge built over the system on October 16 while near Truk, which encouraged slow development. The system developed a weak surface circulation which progressed across the central Philippines. Once it entered the South China Sea, development increased and it became a tropical depression, then tropical storm, on October 22. Transcribing a cyclonic loop, Lex continued to intensify and was a typhoon by October 25.

Moving close to Hainan Island, Lex weakened to a tropical storm while entering the Gulf of Tonkin. Winds gusted to 48 knots (89 km/h) at Waglan Island. The cyclone made landfall near Đồng Hới, Vietnam on October 26 as a moderate tropical storm, and then rapidly weakened after moving inland. In Vietnam, the storm was also known as Typhoon No. 10 (Vietnamese: Cơn bão số 10). According to one source, this storm was the "strongest in 100 years" in the area it passed through. The lowest atmospheric pressure (station pressure) recorded in Đồng Hới during the storm was 980.5hPa.

The drillship Glomar Java Sea sank near Hainan Island during the storm, resulting in the presumed deaths of all 81 people aboard, with 35 bodies recovered. Additionally, approximately 300 Vietnamese fishing boats sank. Over 200 fishermen were reported dead or missing. On land, in Bình Trị Thiên province, a total of 252 people died, with 237 fatalities attributed to flooding and 15 to strong winds.

=== Tropical Depression Trining ===
- Tropical depression (JMA)
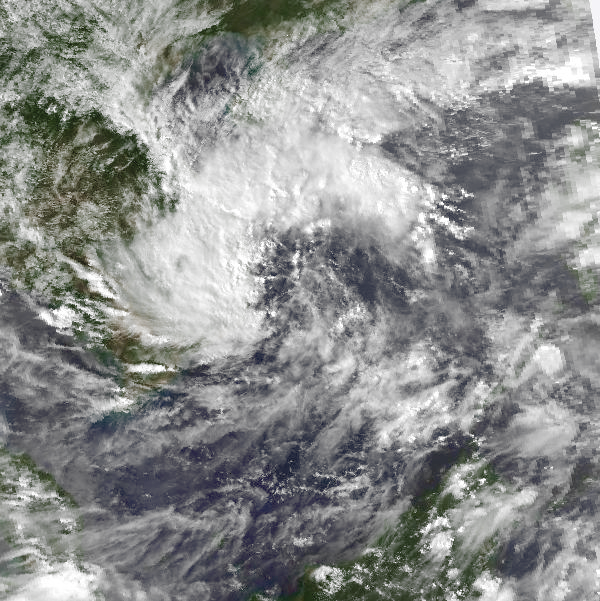
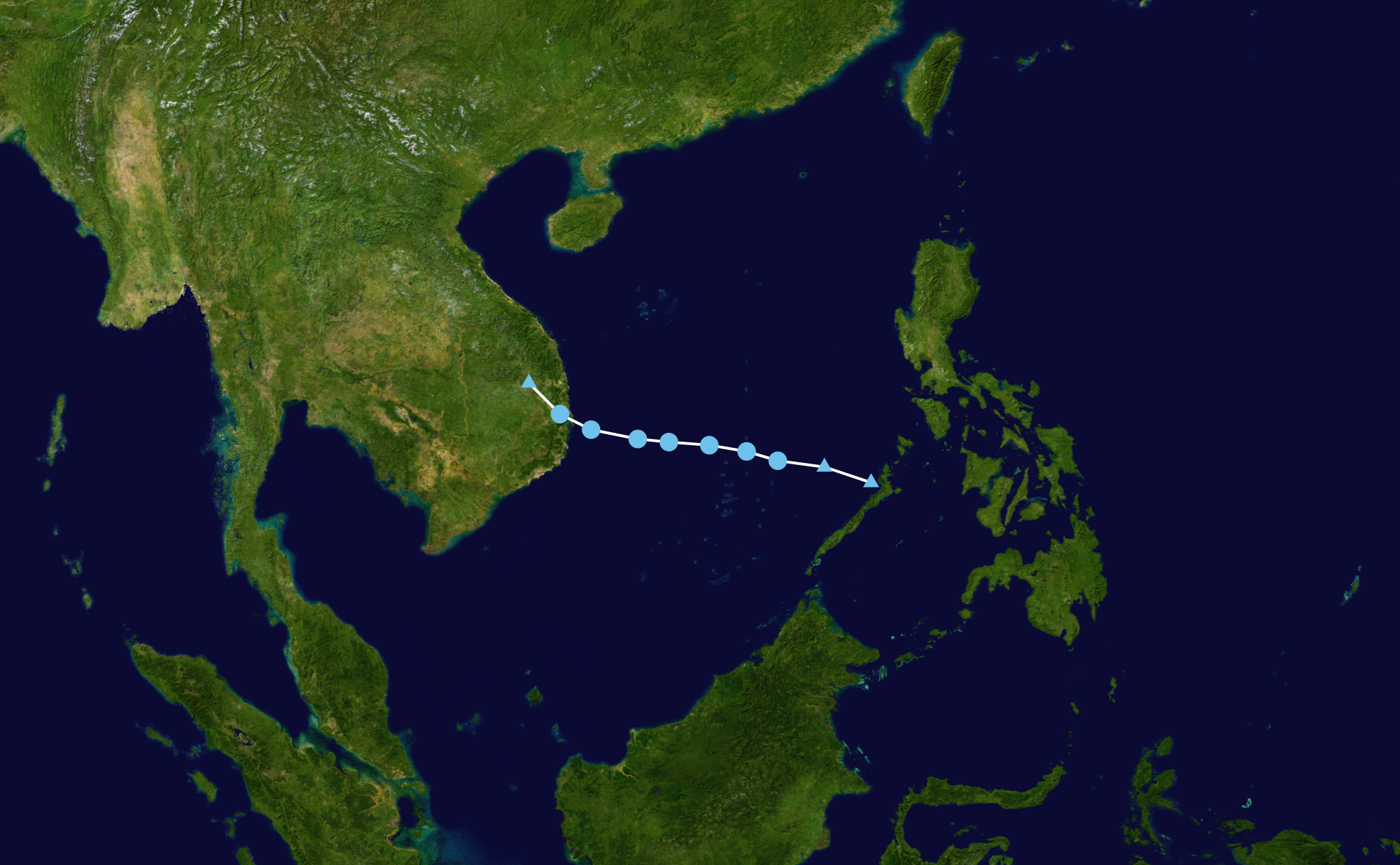
- Duration: October 28 – October 29
- Peak intensity: 55 km/h (35 mph) (10-min); 1004 hPa (mbar)

Tropical Depression Trining formed in the Pacific Ocean during the 1983 Pacific typhoon season. It originated within the monsoon trough on October 28. At its peak, Trining had maximum sustained winds of 55 km/h (35 mph) and a central pressure of 1004 hPa. This tropical depression had a short lifespan that only lasted a day, and later dissipating on October 29. Although weak, even tropical depressions can cause significant impacts, such as heavy rainfall and localized flooding.

=== Typhoon Marge (Uring) ===
- Violent typhoon (JMA)
- Category 5 super typhoon (SSHWS)
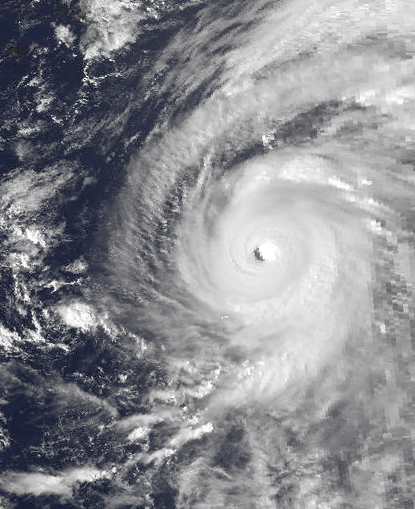
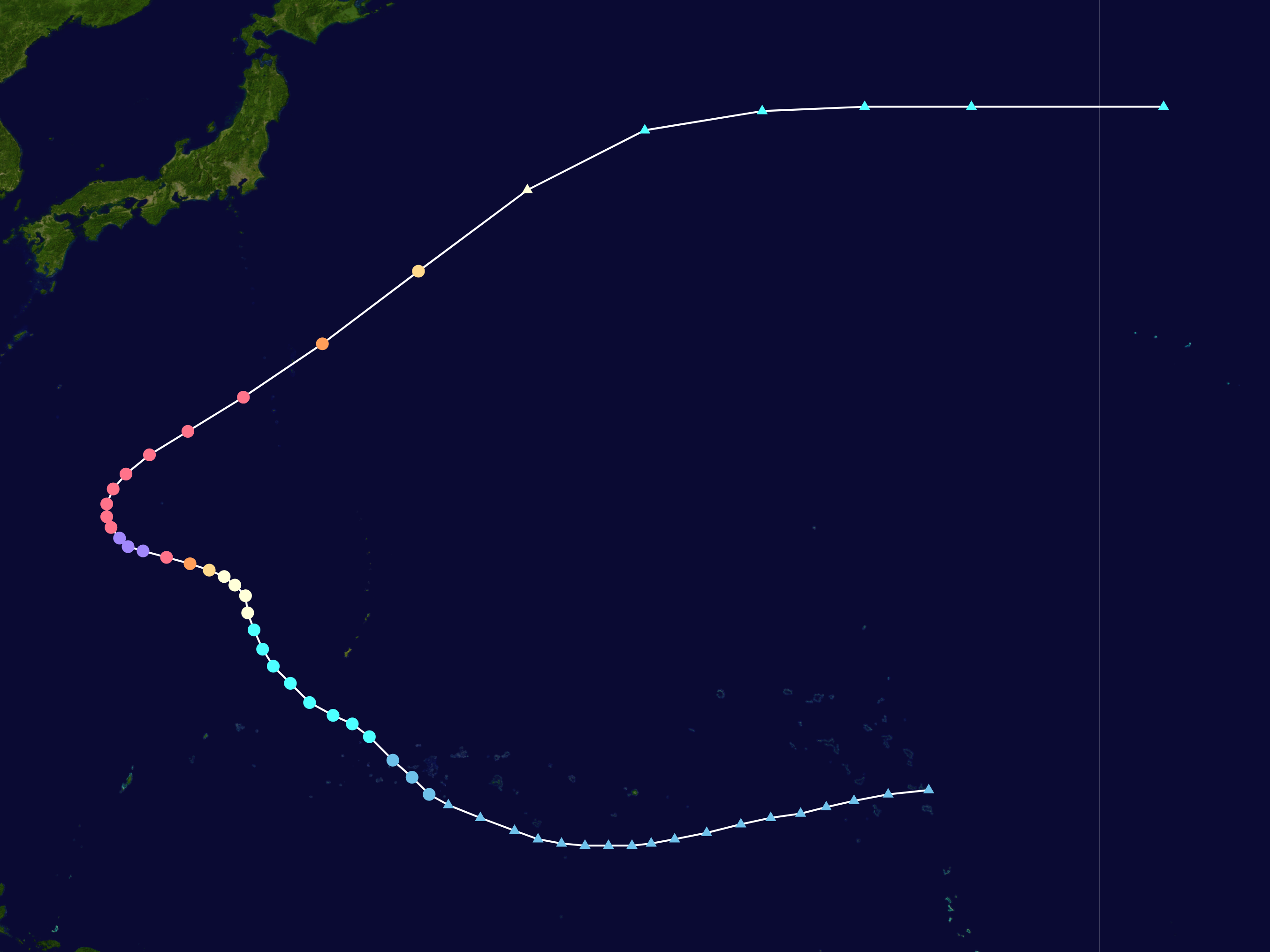
- Duration: October 31 – November 7
- Peak intensity: 205 km/h (125 mph) (10-min); 895 hPa (mbar)

This system began as a tropical disturbance with a weak circulation near 7N 172E. Becoming the fourth super typhoon of the season, Marge stairstepped west-northwest east of the Philippines before recurving east of Japan. During recurvature, its forward motion reached 54 knots (100 km/h), becoming one of the fastest known tropical cyclones on record.

=== Tropical Storm Norris ===
- Tropical storm (JMA)
- Tropical storm (SSHWS)
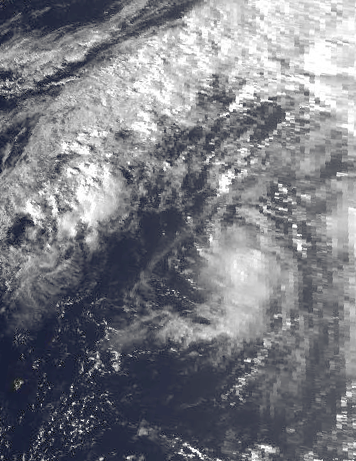
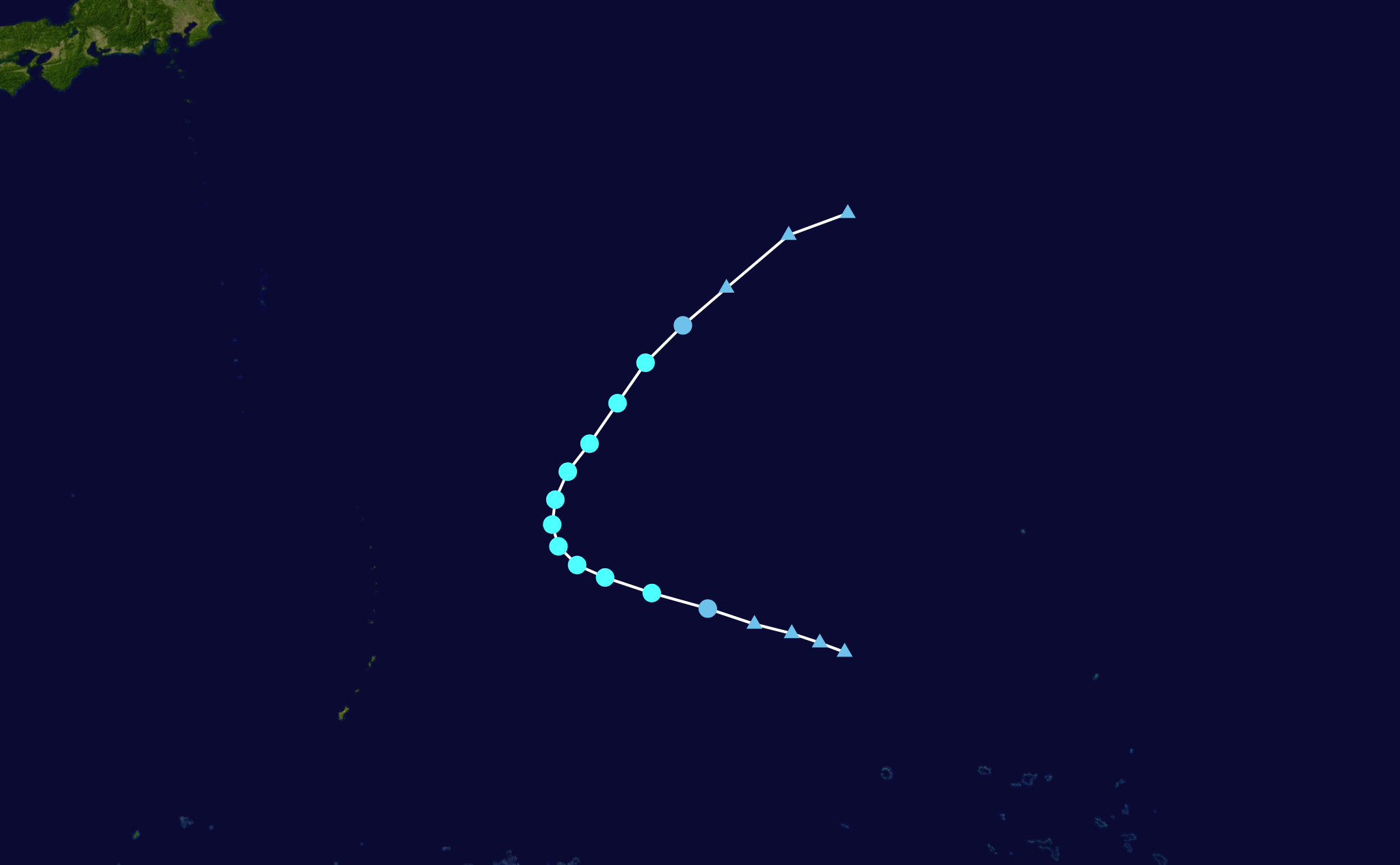
- Duration: November 8 – November 11
- Peak intensity: 85 km/h (50 mph) (10-min); 994 hPa (mbar)

This system was spawned just ahead of a frontal boundary extending from the extratropical cyclone formerly known as Marge. A midget tropical storm, Norris quickly evolved on November 8 and recurved ahead of the frontal boundary well east of Asia, primarily threatening shipping in the western Pacific. Within three days of formation, Norris had been absorbed by the advancing cold front.

=== Typhoon Orchid (Warling) ===
- Violent typhoon (JMA)
- Category 4 typhoon (SSHWS)
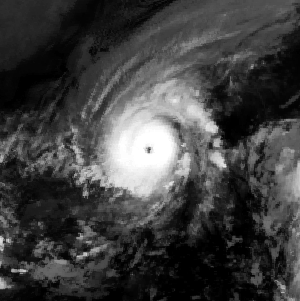
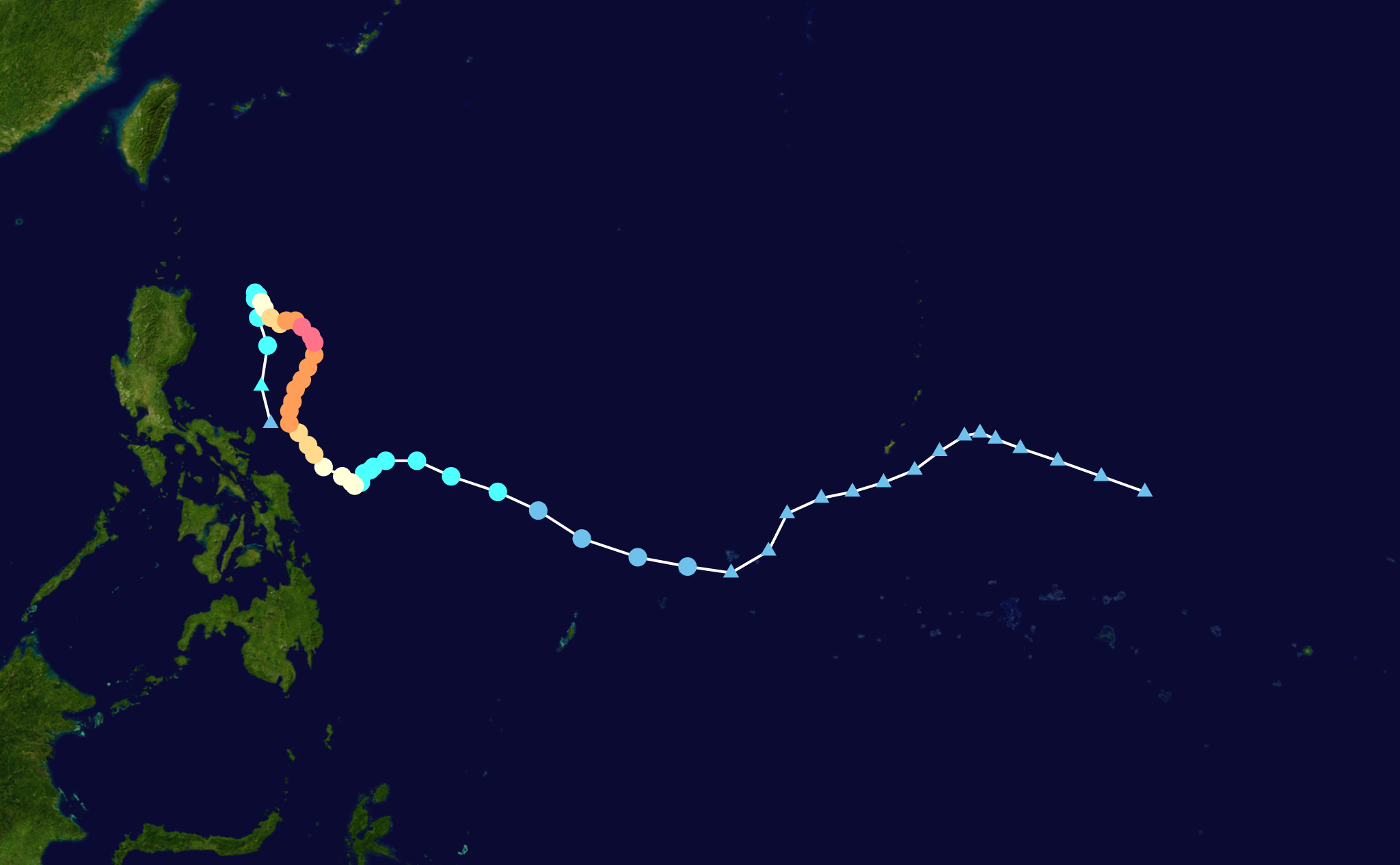
- Duration: November 16 – November 26
- Peak intensity: 205 km/h (125 mph) (10-min); 930 hPa (mbar)

A tropical disturbance organized into a tropical depression on November 14 over the open West Pacific. It tracked southwestward then westward, slowly organizing into a tropical storm on the 17th. Orchid's motion became erratic, and it drifted northward, always remaining within 850 nautical miles (1,570 km) of Typhoon Percy, a slow-moving typhoon in the South China Sea. Orchid reached her peak of 145 mph (233 km/h) winds on the 23rd, before vertical shear caused it to weaken. The storm turned southward, where it dissipated on the 27th. A total of 167 fatalities occurred when the Philippine vessel MV Dona Cassandra capsized due to high waves off the coast of Mindanao. A total of 219 people survived the shipwreck, including 98 that were rescued. In addition, 89 persons were injured, 18 at sea. At the time of the shipwreck, the vessel had 387 passengers and 36 crew members. Onshore the Philippines, three people were killed and thousands were displaced.

=== Typhoon Percy (Yayang) ===
- Typhoon (JMA)
- Category 1 typhoon (SSHWS)
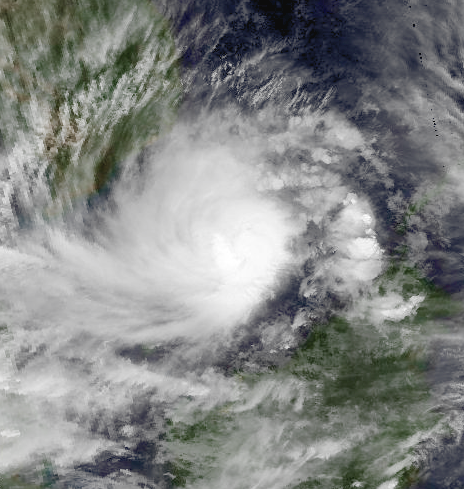
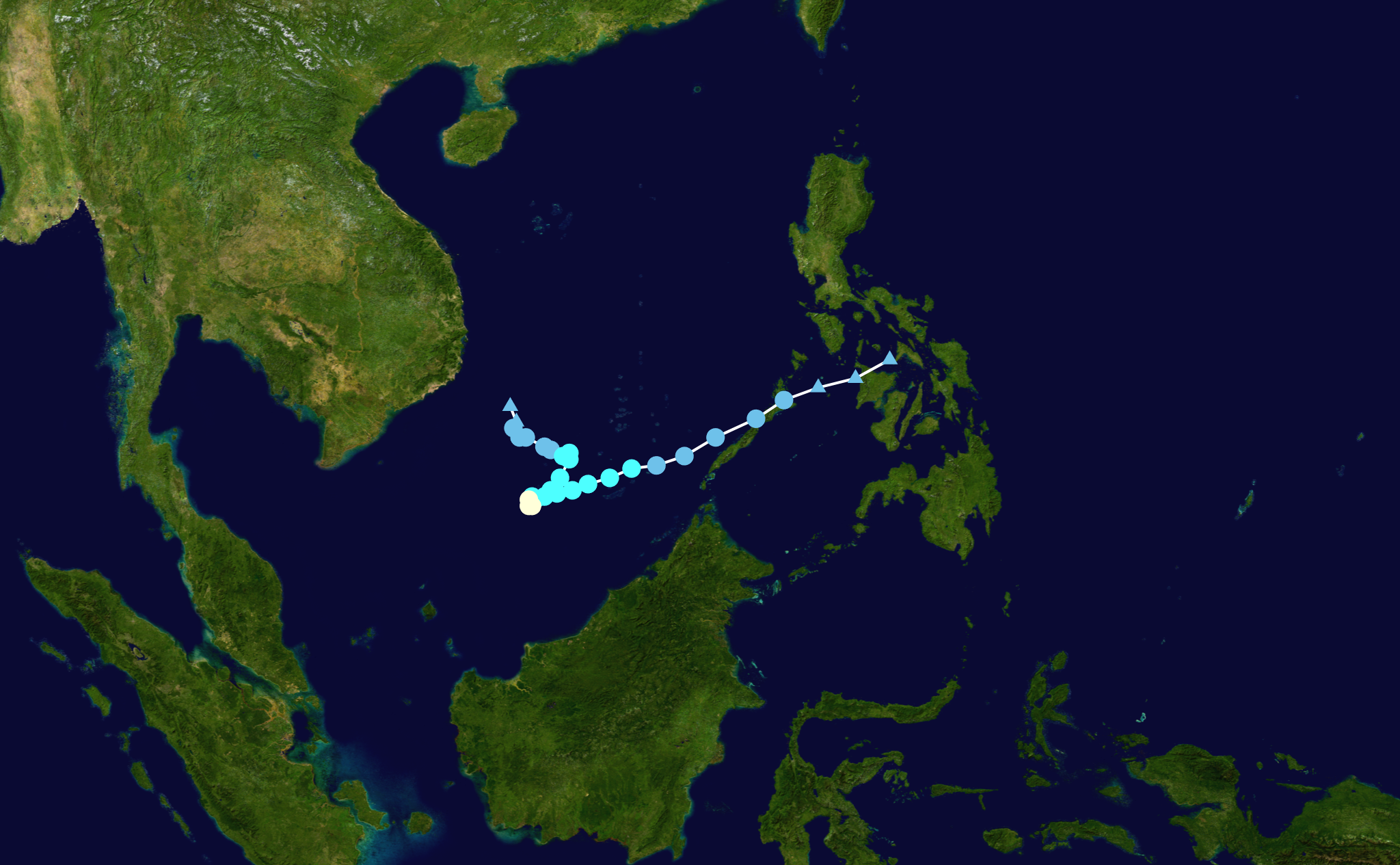
- Duration: November 18 – November 24
- Peak intensity: 130 km/h (80 mph) (10-min); 970 hPa (mbar)

Located not too distant to the southwest of Orchid, Percy thrived in a divergent region created by Orchid's outflow pattern beginning on November 17. Rapid development occurred on the morning of November 19 while in the South China Sea, and the system meandered due to the weakness in steering created by Orchid to its northeast. The cyclone managed 160 kilometres (99 mi) of movement through November 23. Briefly becoming a typhoon, eventually Percy became entrained in Orchid's inflow band and began to be sheared by Orchid's opposing outflow pattern. Other than moving through the Philippines while in the initial tropical depression phase, Percy affected no other land masses.

=== Severe Tropical Storm Ruth (Ading) ===
- Severe tropical storm (JMA)
- Tropical storm (SSHWS)
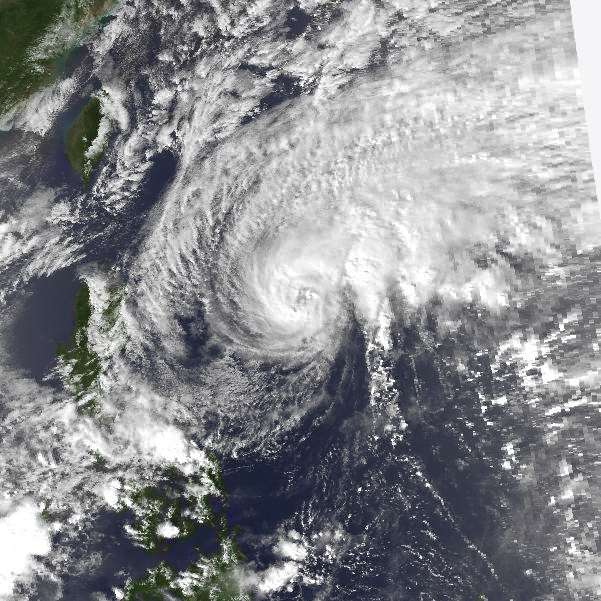
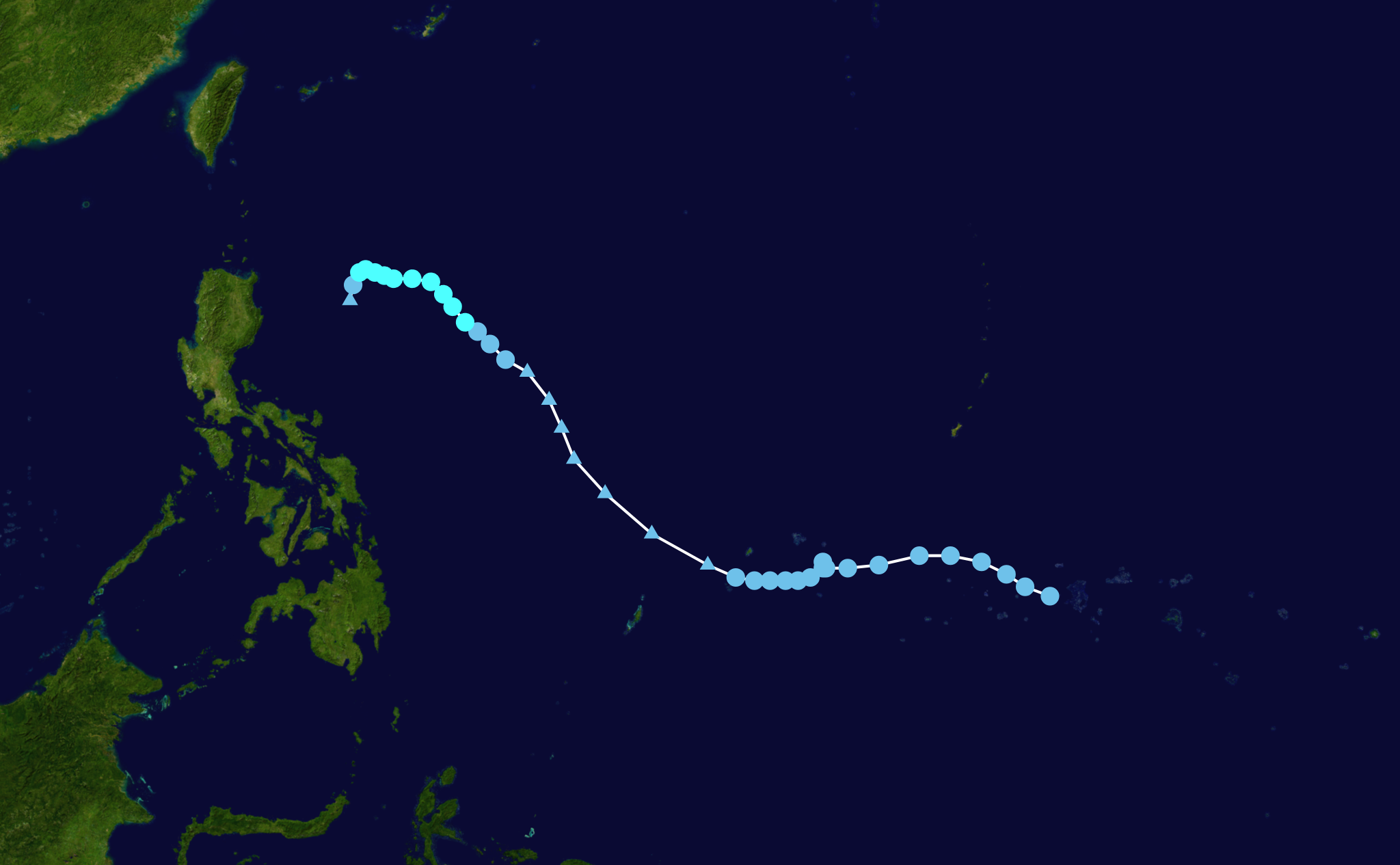
- Duration: November 21 – November 30
- Peak intensity: 95 km/h (60 mph) (10-min); 992 hPa (mbar)

This system began along the near equatorial trough southeast of Guam on November 15. Moving slowly westward, there was little additional development until November 19. Thunderstorm activity significantly increased in coverage along a 1,670 kilometres (1,040 mi) east–west axis, with a center forming near 5N 147E. The system moved slowly northwest until November 23. Orchid acted to limit its development by robbing inflow from this disturbance. On the 23rd it became a tropical depression before executing an anticyclonic loop. Upper-level conditions became hostile soon afterwards, and the depression weakened. Into November 27 the system moved erratically and went through cycles of convective development and shearing. When Orchid weakened into a tropical depression, Ruth began to develop rapidly and became a tropical storm early on November 28. A frontal zone on its northwest side led to an intense gale in that quadrant, which led to the upgrade. The cyclone nearly became a typhoon later that day before vertical wind shear returned, introduced by a fresh cold outbreak from Asia. The cyclone degenerated to an exposed low-level swirl on November 30.

=== Tropical Storm Sperry (Barang) ===
- Tropical storm (JMA)
- Tropical storm (SSHWS)
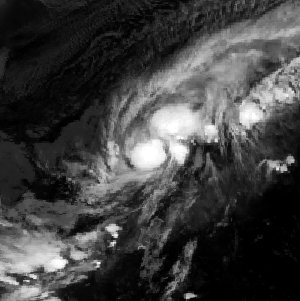
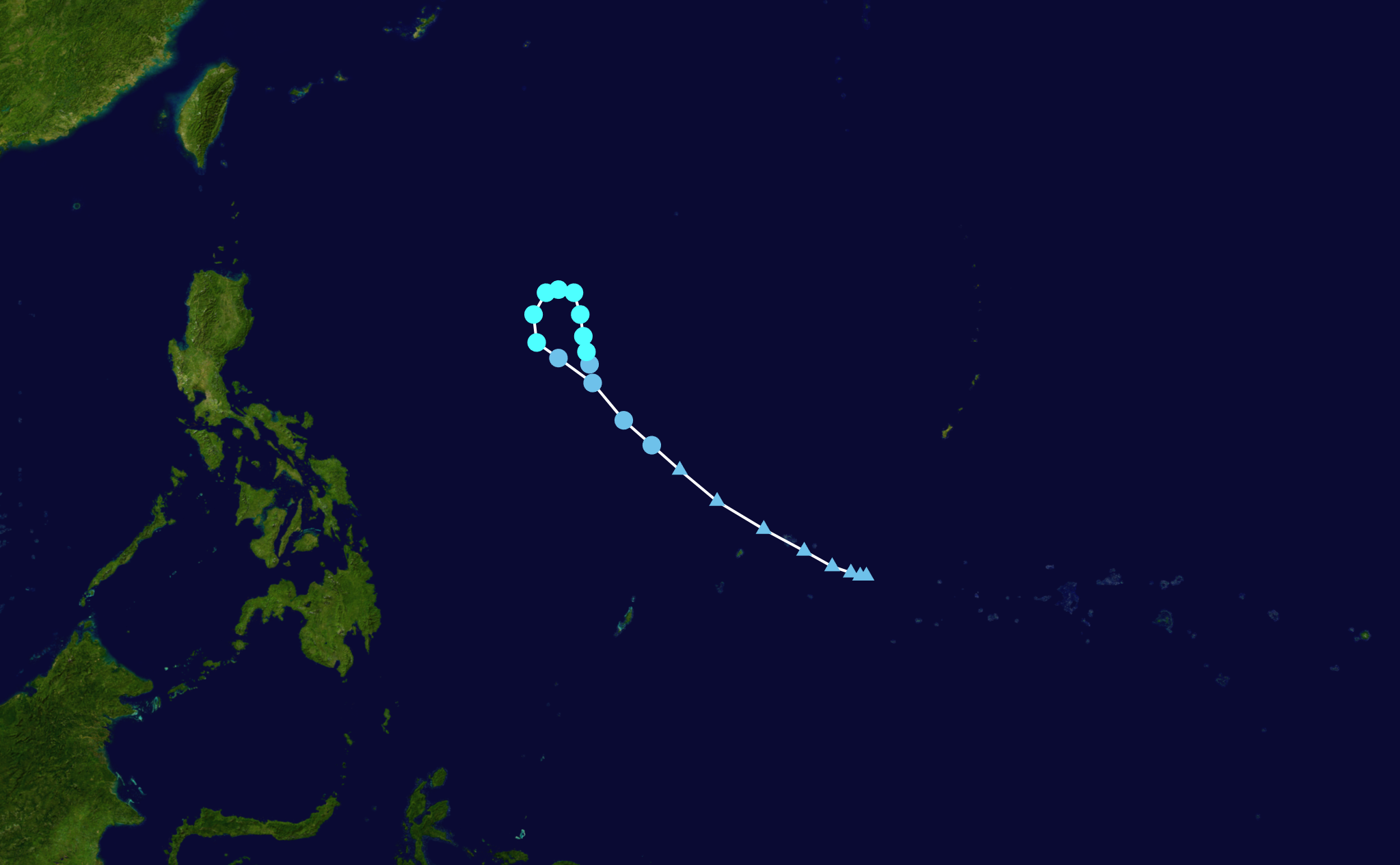
- Duration: November 30 – December 5
- Peak intensity: 85 km/h (50 mph) (10-min); 996 hPa (mbar)

The initial disturbance formed along the near equatorial trough after Ruth dissipated. On November 30 a surface circulation formed 740 kilometres (460 mi) south of Guam. By December 1, the system appeared to be forming into a tropical cyclone but its thunderstorm activity shifted over 900 kilometres (560 mi) to the northwest of the center. Taking a day to recover, the system attempted to reorganize and became a tropical storm early on December 3. Southerly vertical wind shear limited its development for much of its life cycle. Turning eastward, it reached its maximum intensity late on the 3rd before shearing apart on December 4. Early on December 5, the system degenerated into a weak area of low pressure.

=== Severe Tropical Storm Thelma (Krising) ===
- Severe tropical storm (JMA)
- Tropical storm (SSHWS)
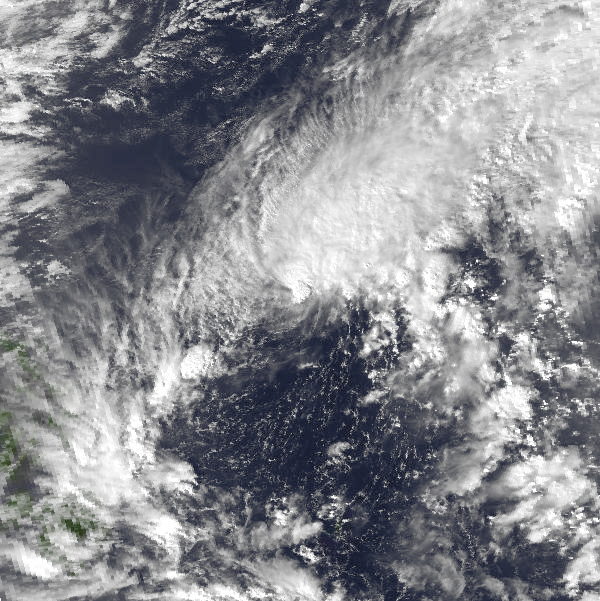
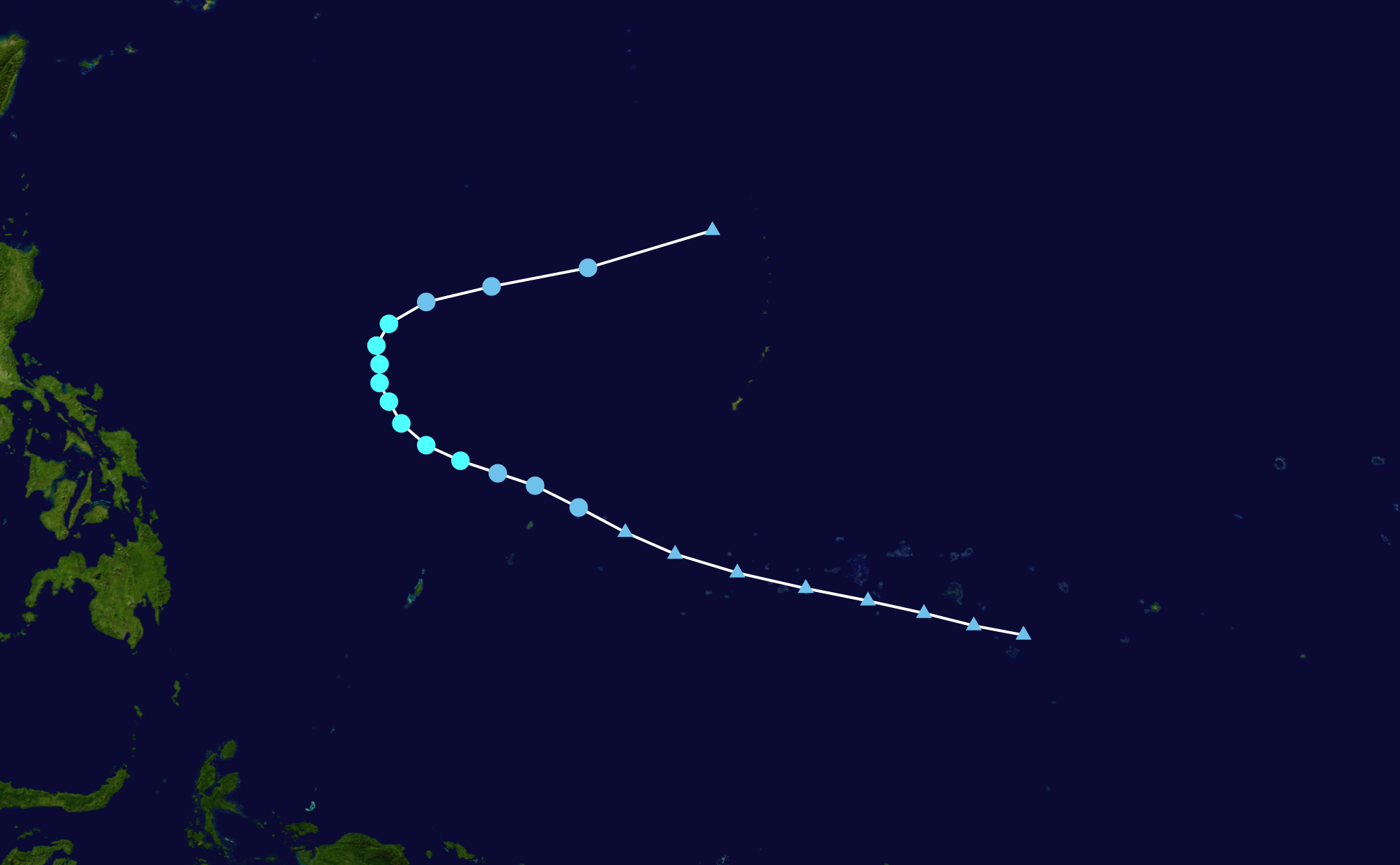
- Duration: December 15 – December 18
- Peak intensity: 100 km/h (65 mph) (10-min); 990 hPa (mbar)

This system formed east of the Caroline Islands on December 11 near 4N 170E. Over the next couple days, an upper cyclone to its north shifted westward, which helped lead to increased outflow and a low-level circulation. It moved rapidly westward for the next 60 hours as a poorly defined low despite increasing convective organization. By late morning on December 16, it became a tropical storm. The system tracked along a smooth parabola east of the Philippines becoming a moderately strong tropical storm. Intense vertical wind shear struck the cyclone as it moved northeast at a clip up to 27 knots (50 km/h), and the system rapidly weakened.

=== Tropical Depression Dadang ===
- Tropical depression (PAGASA)
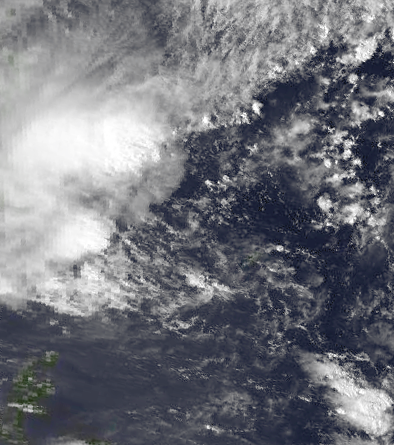
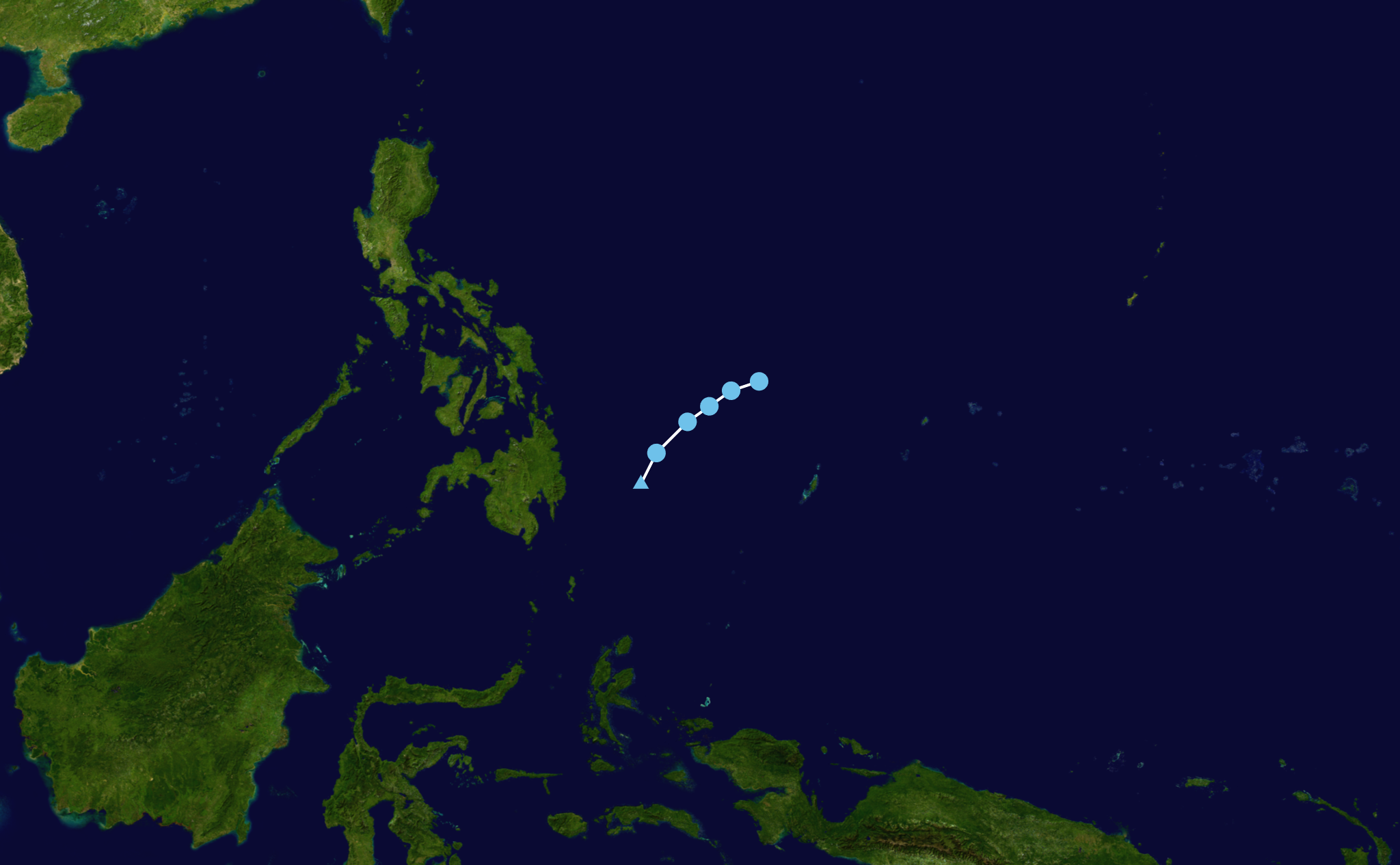
- Duration: December 18 – December 20
- Peak intensity: 55 km/h (35 mph) (10-min); 1006 hPa (mbar)

A Tropical Depression formed on December 18 within the PAR or Philippine Area of Responsibility, PAGASA or Philippine Atmospheric, Geophysical and Astronomical Services Administration tracked the depression and later gave it the local "Dadang". Tropical Depression Dadang is a type of tropical cyclone that forms in the Western Pacific Ocean. It develops from a tropical depression in the atmosphere, gradually organizing into a low-pressure system with a defined circulation center. As it intensifies, it reaches wind speeds characteristic of a tropical depression, typically below 55 km/h (35 mph). The track and intensity of Dadang are influenced by factors like wind shear, ocean temperatures, and steering currents. Potential impacts include heavy rainfall, strong winds, and rough seas, varying significantly depending on the storm's characteristics and the terrain it encounters. Tropical Depression Dadang later dissipated on December 20.

== Storm names ==
=== International ===
During the season 23 named tropical cyclones developed in the Western Pacific and were named by the Joint Typhoon Warning Center, when it was determined that they had become tropical storms. These names were contributed to a revised list from 1979.

Sarah	Tip	Vera	Wayne	Abby	Ben	Carmen	Dom	Ellen	Forrest	Georgia	Herbert
Ida	Joe	Kim	Lex	Marge	Norris	Orchid	Percy	Ruth	Sperry	Thelma	

=== Philippines ===
Auring	Bebeng	Katring	Diding	Etang
Gening	Herming	Ising	Luding	Mameng
Neneng	Oniang	Pepang	Rosing	Sisang
Trining	Uring	Warling	Yayang	
Auxiliary list
				Ading
Barang	Krising	Dadang	Erling (unused)	Goying (unused)

The Philippine Atmospheric, Geophysical and Astronomical Services Administration uses its own naming scheme for tropical cyclones in their area of responsibility. PAGASA assigns names to tropical depressions that form within their area of responsibility and any tropical cyclone that might move into their area of responsibility. Should the list of names for a given year prove to be insufficient, names are taken from an auxiliary list, the first 6 of which are published each year before the season starts. Names not retired from this list will be used again in the 1987 season. This is the same list used for the 1979 season. PAGASA uses its own naming scheme that starts in the Filipino alphabet, with names of Filipino female names ending with "ng" (A, B, K, D, etc.). Names that were not assigned/going to use are marked in gray.

== Season effects ==
This table will list all the storms that developed in the northwestern Pacific Ocean west of the International Date Line and north of the equator during 1983. It will include their intensity, duration, name, areas affected, deaths, missing persons (in parentheses), and damage totals. Classification and intensity values will be based on estimations conducted by the JMA. All damage figures will be in 1983 USD. Damages and deaths from a storm will include when the storm was a precursor wave or an extratropical low.

Name	Dates	Peak intensity			Areas affected	Damage (USD)	Deaths	Ref(s).
Name	Dates	Category	Wind speed	Pressure	Areas affected	Damage (USD)	Deaths	Ref(s).
TD	June 8–9	Tropical depression	Not specified	1004 hPa (29.65 inHg)	South China	None	None	
TD	June 20–22	Tropical depression	Not specified	1004 hPa (29.65 inHg)	Philippines	$249 million	None	
Sarah	June 24–27	Tropical storm	65 km/h (40 mph)	998 hPa (29.47 inHg)	Vietnam, Laos, Cambodia	None	None	
Tip (Auring)	July 10–14	Typhoon	120 km/h (75 mph)	975 hPa (28.79 inHg)	Philippines, South China	None	None	
Vera (Bebeng)	July 10–19	Typhoon	140 km/h (85 mph)	965 hPa (28.50 inHg)	Caroline Islands, Philippines, South China, Vietnam	$42 million	127	
Wayne (Katring)	July 22–26	Violent typhoon	205 km/h (125 mph)	925 hPa (27.32 inHg)	Philippines, South China	Unknown	147	
Abby (Diding)	August 4–18	Violent Typhoon	220 km/h (135 mph)	895 hPa (26.43 inHg)	Caroline Islands, Japan	Unknown	7	
Gil	August 7–8	Tropical depression	Not specified	1016 hPa (30.01 inHg)	Wake Island	None	None	
Carmen (Etang)	August 9–15	Tropical storm	75 km/h (45 mph)	992 hPa (29.29 inHg)	Philippines	None	None	
Ben	August 11–15	Severetropical storm	100 km/h (60 mph)	985 hPa (29.09 inHg)	Japan	None	None	
Dom (Gening)	August 18–28	Tropical storm	75 km/h (45 mph)	996 hPa (29.41 inHg)	None	None	None	
TD	August 18–19	Tropical depression	Not specified	1004 hPa (29.65 inHg)	South China	None	None	
09W	August 25–27	Tropical depression	55 km/h (35 mph)	998 hPa (29.47 inHg)	Ryukyu Islands, Korean Peninsula	None	None	
Ellen (Herming)	August 28 – September 10	Violent typhoon	205 km/h (125 mph)	925 hPa (27.32 inHg)	Caroline Islands, Philippines, Taiwan, Southeast China	$79.7 million	23	
02C	September 1–4	Tropical depression	55 km/h (35 mph)	1008 hPa (29.77 inHg)	Marshall Islands	None	None	
Forrest (Ising)	September 19–29	Violent typhoon	205 km/h (125 mph)	876 hPa (25.87 inHg)	Caroline Islands, Mariana Islands, East China, South Korea, Japan	$339 million	21	
Georgia (Luding)	September 27 – October 2	Typhoon	130 km/h (80 mph)	980 hPa (28.94 inHg)	Philippines, South China, Vietnam, Laos	Unknown	26	
Mameng	September 29 – October 4	Tropical depression	55 km/h (35 mph)	1000 hPa (29.53 inHg)	Philippines, Vietnam, Laos	None	None	
Herbert (Neneng)	October 3–11	Tropical storm	85 km/h (55 mph)	994 hPa (29.35 inHg)	Philippines, Vietnam, Cambodia	None	None	
Ida (Oniang)	October 7–11	Severe tropical storm	110 km/h (70 mph)	975 hPa (28.79 inHg)	Mariana Islands, Japan	None	None	
Joe (Pepang)	October 9–14	Severe tropical storm	100 km/h (60 mph)	975 hPa (28.79 inHg)	Philippines, South China	Unknown	Unknown	
Kim (Rosing)	October 15–18	Tropical storm	75 km/h (45 mph)	994 hPa (29.35 inHg)	Philippines, Vietnam, Cambodia, Thailand	$26 million	>300	
Lex (Sisang)	October 19–27	Severe tropical storm	95 km/h (60 mph)	985 hPa (29.09 inHg)	Philippines, South China, Vietnam, Laos	Unknown	>333	
Trining	October 28–29	Tropical depression	55 km/h (35 mph)	1004 hPa (29.65 inHg)	Philippines, Vietnam	None	None	
Marge (Uring)	October 31 – November 7	Violent typhoon	220 kilometres per hour (140 mph)	895 hPa (26.43 inHg)	Caroline Islands, Mariana Islands	None	None	
Norris	November 8–11	Tropical storm	85 km/h (55 mph)	994 hPa (29.35 inHg)	None	None	None	
Orchid (Warling)	November 16–26	Violent typhoon	205 km/h (125 mph)	930 hPa (27.46 inHg)	Caroline Islands, Philippines	Unknown	170	
Percy (Yayang)	November 18–25	Typhoon	130 km/h (80 mph)	970 hPa (28.79 inHg)	Vietnam, Philippines	Unknown	None	
Ruth (Ading)	November 21–30	Severe tropical storm	95 km/h (60 mph)	992 hPa (29.29 inHg)	Caroline Islands	None	None	
Sperry (Barang)	November 30 – December 5	Tropical storm	85 km/h (55 mph)	996 hPa (29.41 inHg)	None	None	None	
Thelma (Krising)	December 15–18	Severe tropical storm	100 km/h (60 mph)	990 hPa (29.23 inHg)	Caroline Islands	None	None	
Dadang	December 18–20	Tropical depression	55 km/h (35 mph)	1004 hPa (29.65 inHg)	Philippines	None	None	
Season aggregates
32 systems	June 8 – December 20, 1983		220 km/h (135 mph)	885 hPa (26.13 inHg)		>$397 million	>1,021	

== See also ==
- List of Pacific typhoon seasons
- 1983 Pacific hurricane season
- 1983 Atlantic hurricane season
- 1983 North Indian Ocean cyclone season
- Australian cyclone seasons: 1982–83, 1983–84
- South Pacific cyclone seasons: 1982–83, 1983–84
- South-West Indian Ocean cyclone seasons: 1982–83, 1983–84
