= 1983–84 South Pacific cyclone season =

Tropical cyclone season

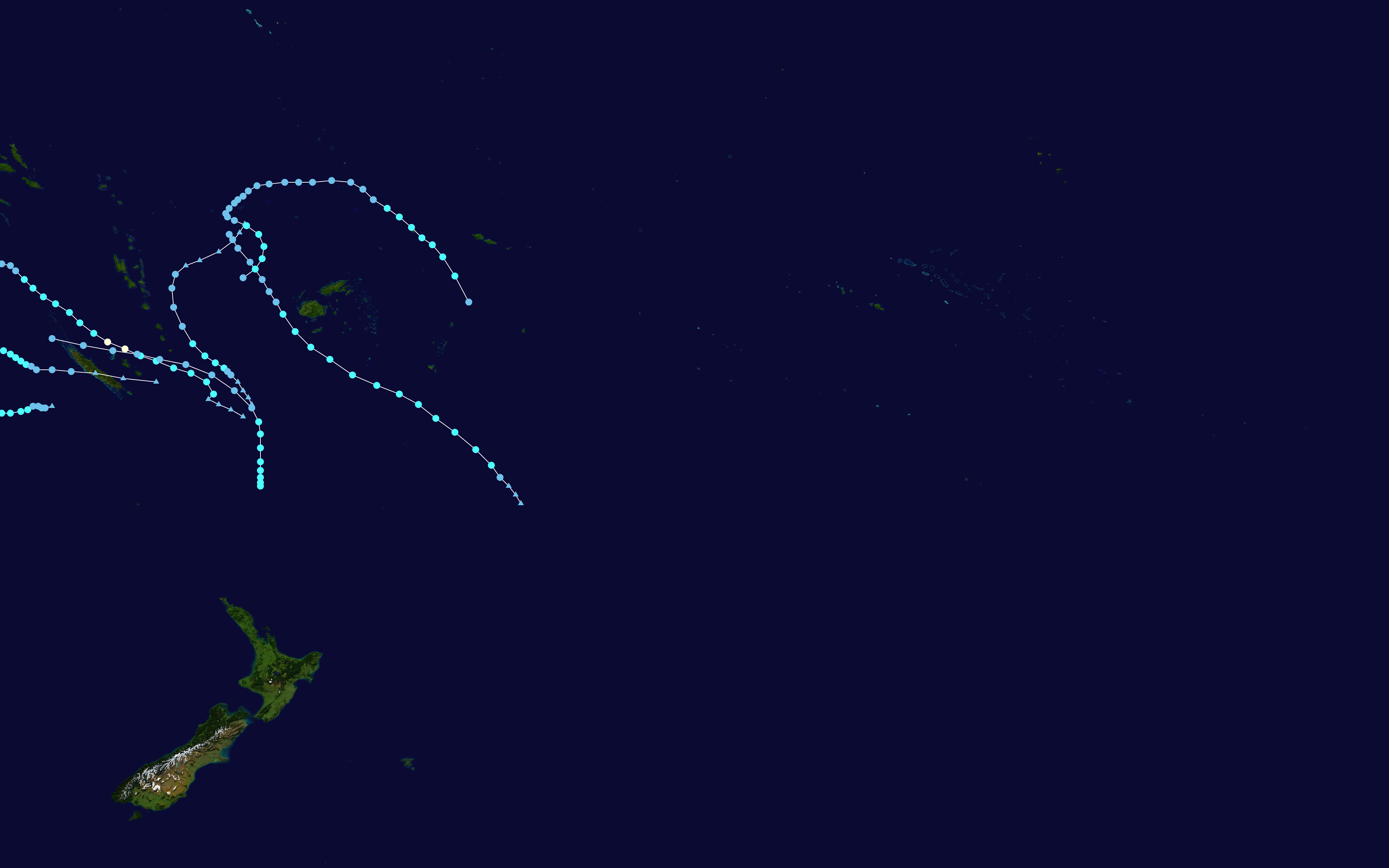
- Season summary map

Seasonal boundaries
- First system formed: December 27, 1983
- Last system dissipated: March 30, 1984

Strongest storm
- Name: Beti
  - Maximum winds: 120 km/h (75 mph) (10-minute sustained)
  - Lowest pressure: 970 hPa (mbar)

Seasonal statistics
- Total depressions: 7
- Tropical cyclones: 7
- Severe tropical cyclones: 1
- Total fatalities: Unknown
- Total damage: Unknown

Related articles
- 1983–84 Australian region cyclone season; 1983–84 South-West Indian Ocean cyclone season

The 1983–84 South Pacific tropical cyclone season was a slightly below-average season. It featured a total of 7 tropical depressions, all of which strengthened to become tropical cyclones, though only one storm became a severe tropical cyclone.

== Seasonal summary ==
During November and December, no significant tropical cyclones developed in or moved into the South Pacific basin.

== Systems ==
=== Tropical Cyclone Atu ===
- Category 1 tropical cyclone (Australian scale)
- Tropical storm (SSHWS)
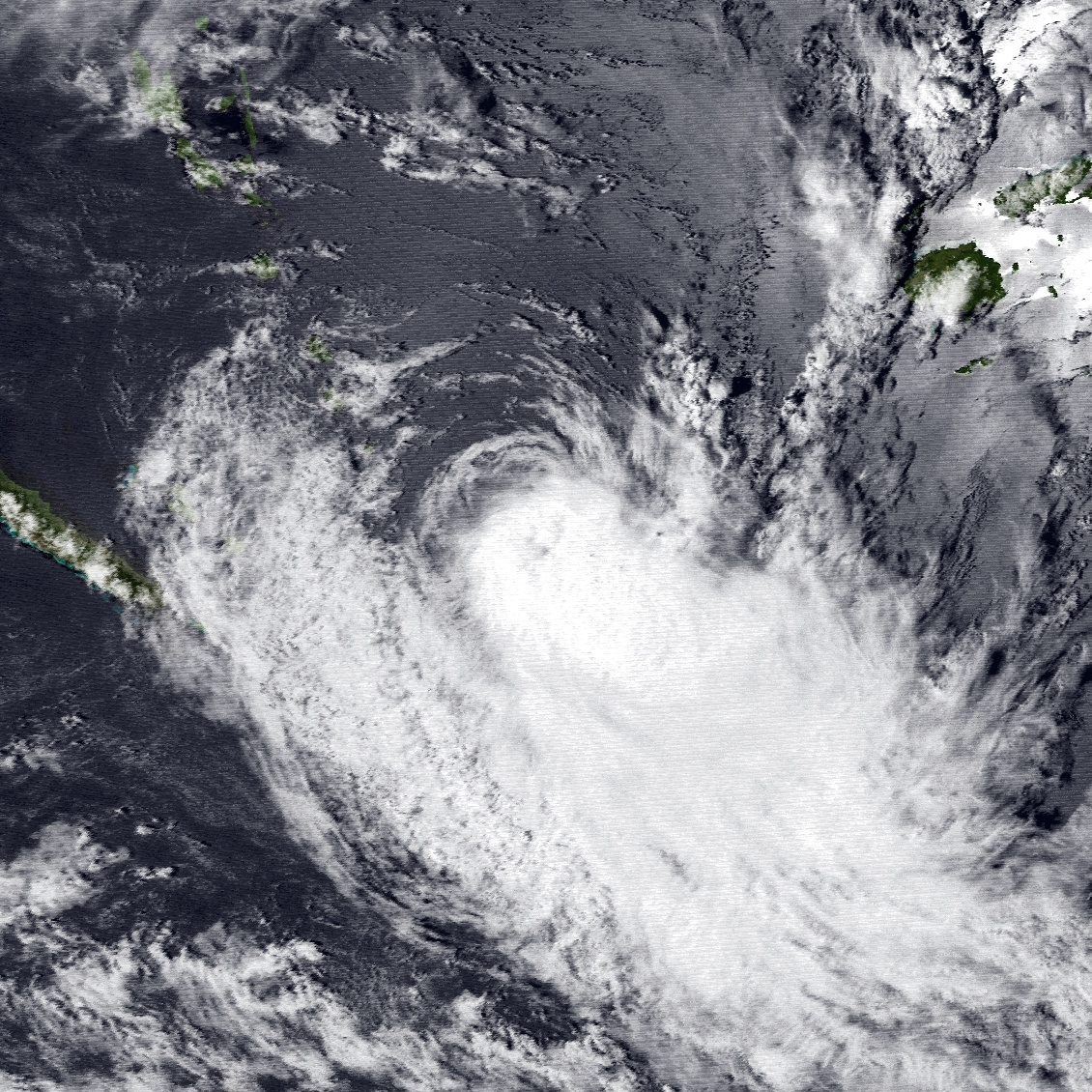
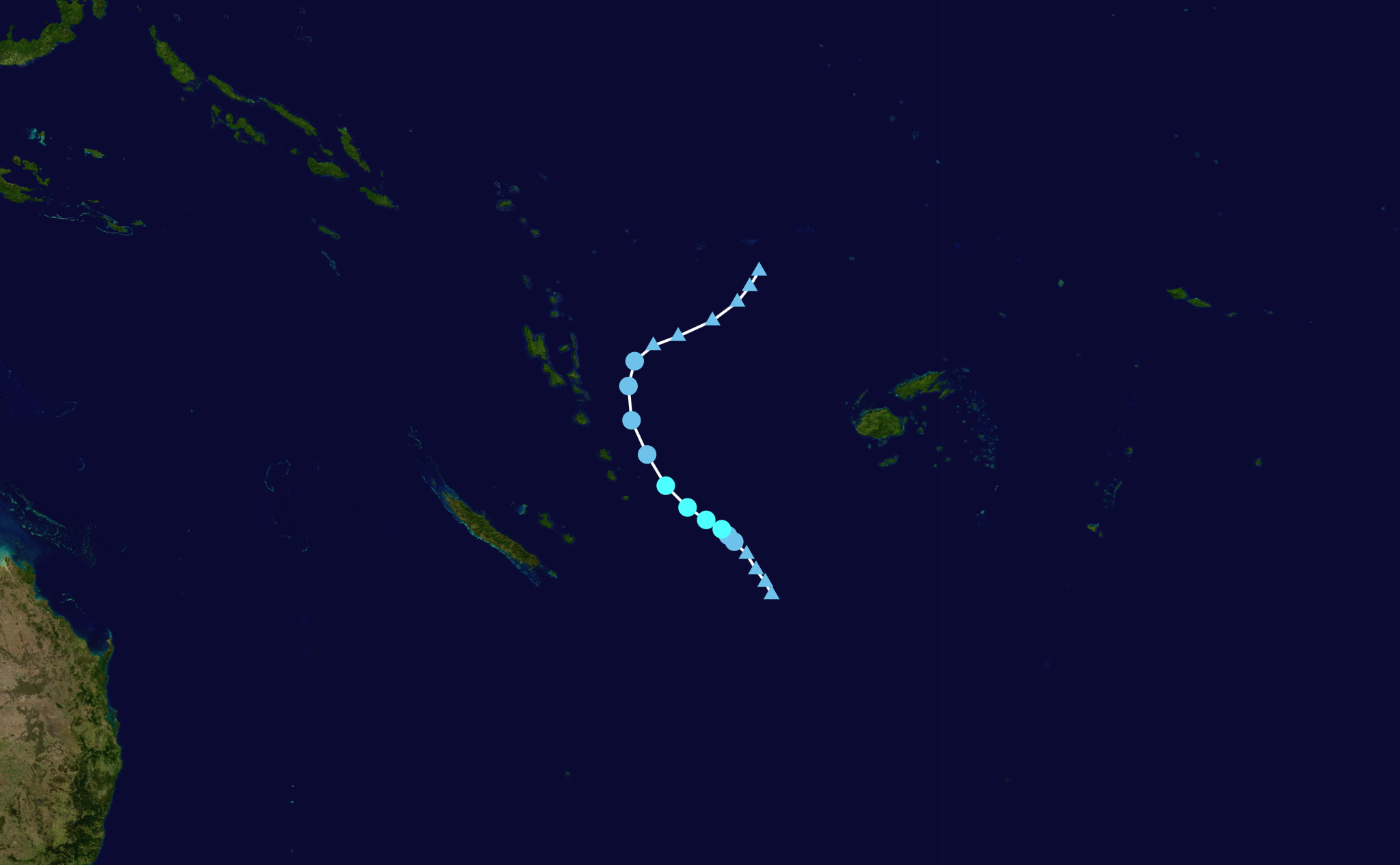
- Duration: December 27 – December 30
- Peak intensity: 85 km/h (50 mph) (10-min); 987 hPa (mbar)

Tropical Cyclone Atu existed from December 27 to December 30.

=== Severe Tropical Cyclone Beti ===
- Category 3 severe tropical cyclone (Australian scale)
- Category 1 tropical cyclone (SSHWS)
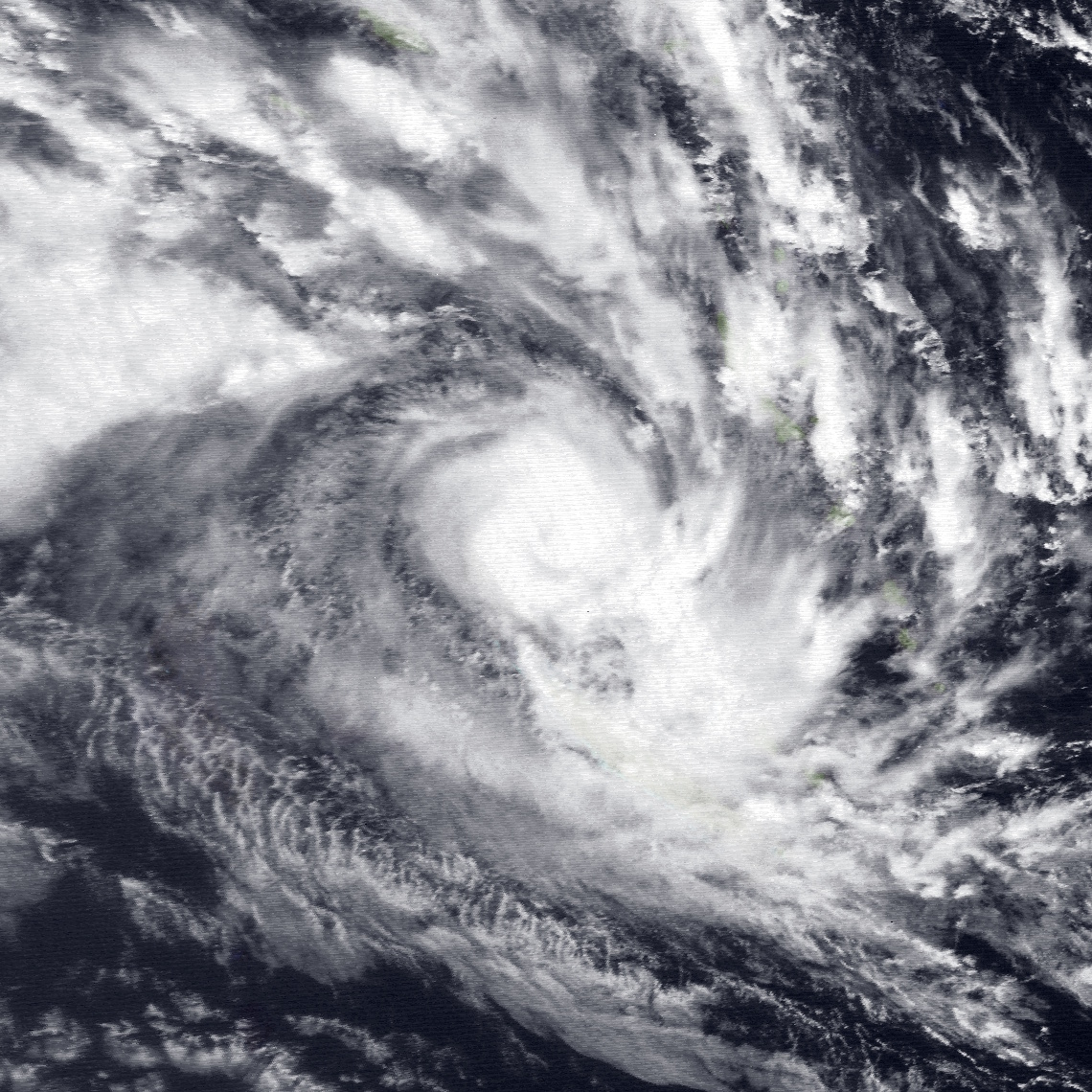
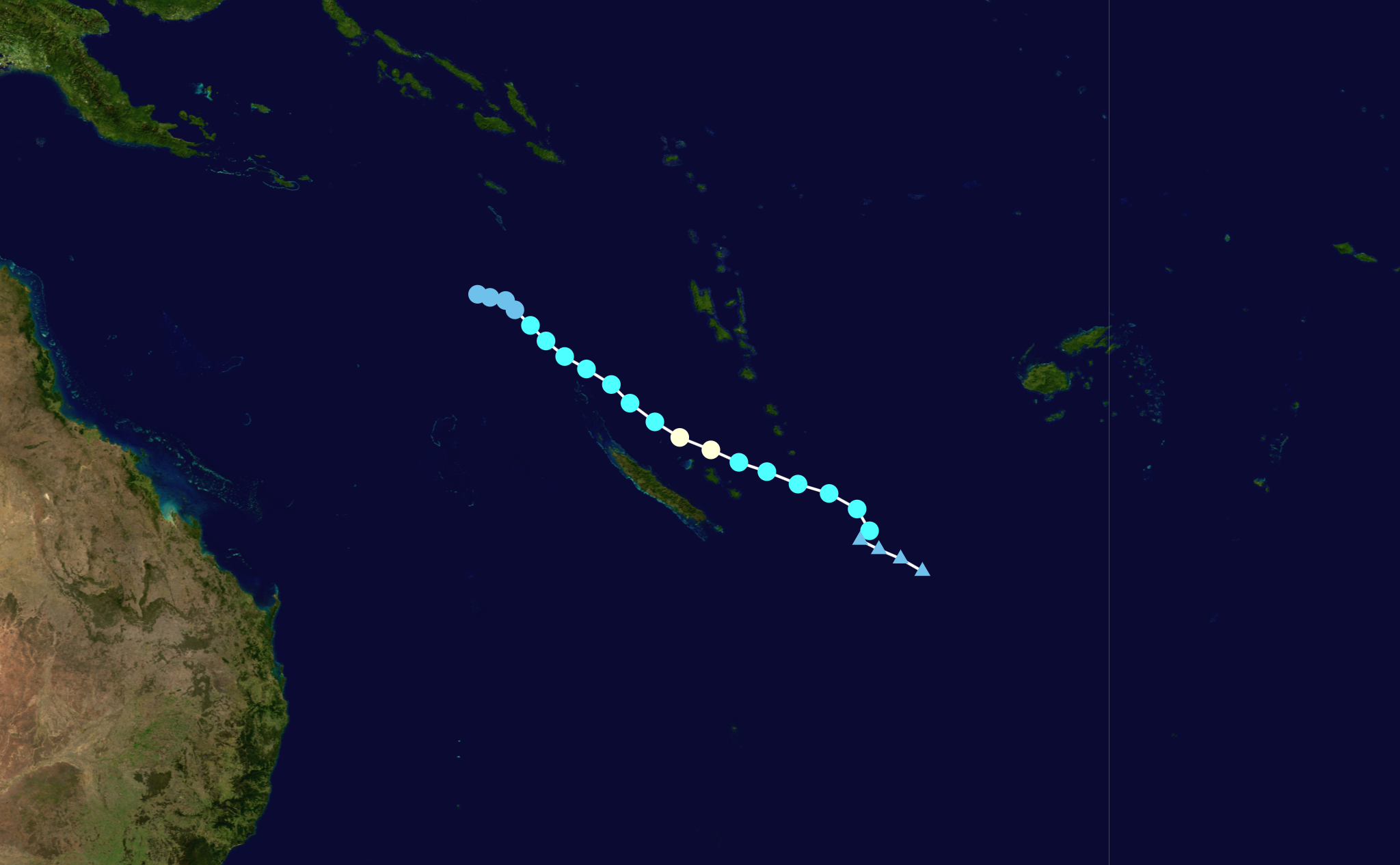
- Duration: January 30 – February 5
- Peak intensity: 120 km/h (75 mph) (10-min); 970 hPa (mbar)

During 30 January, a shallow tropical low developed over the south-eastern Coral Sea. Over the next couple of days the system gradually developed further as it moved westwards into the South Pacific basin.

=== Tropical Cyclone Harvey ===
- Category 2 tropical cyclone (Australian scale)
- Tropical storm (SSHWS)
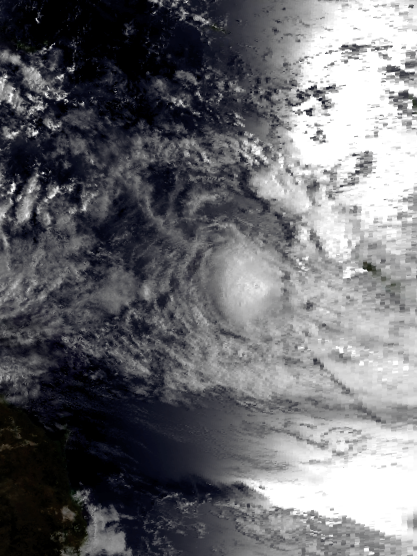
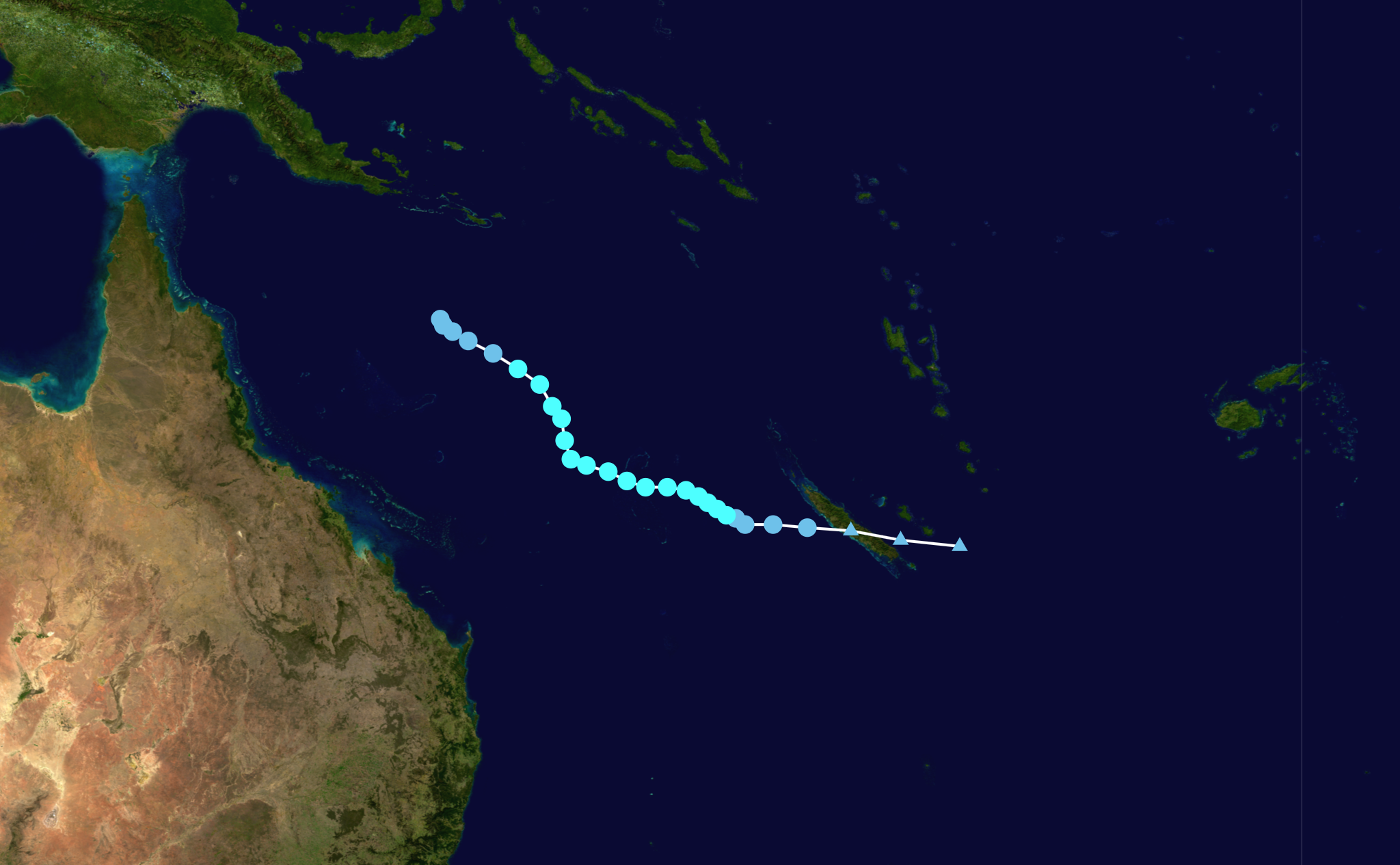
- Duration: February 7 (Entered basin) – February 8
- Peak intensity: 100 km/h (65 mph) (10-min); 980 hPa (mbar)

During February 7, Cyclone Harvey moved into the basin from the Australian region as a category 2 tropical cyclone with 10-minute windspeeds of 100 km/h (60 mph). During the next day, Harvey gradually weakened as it moved towards the southeast, before at 1800 UTC the JTWC and TCWC Nadi reported that Harvey had weakened below tropical cyclone intensity. The subsequent remnant low continued to move towards the south-southeast before it was last noted by the FMS on February 10, while it was located about 270 km (170 mi) to the east of New Caledonia.

=== Unnamed tropical cyclone ===
- Category 1 tropical cyclone (Australian scale)
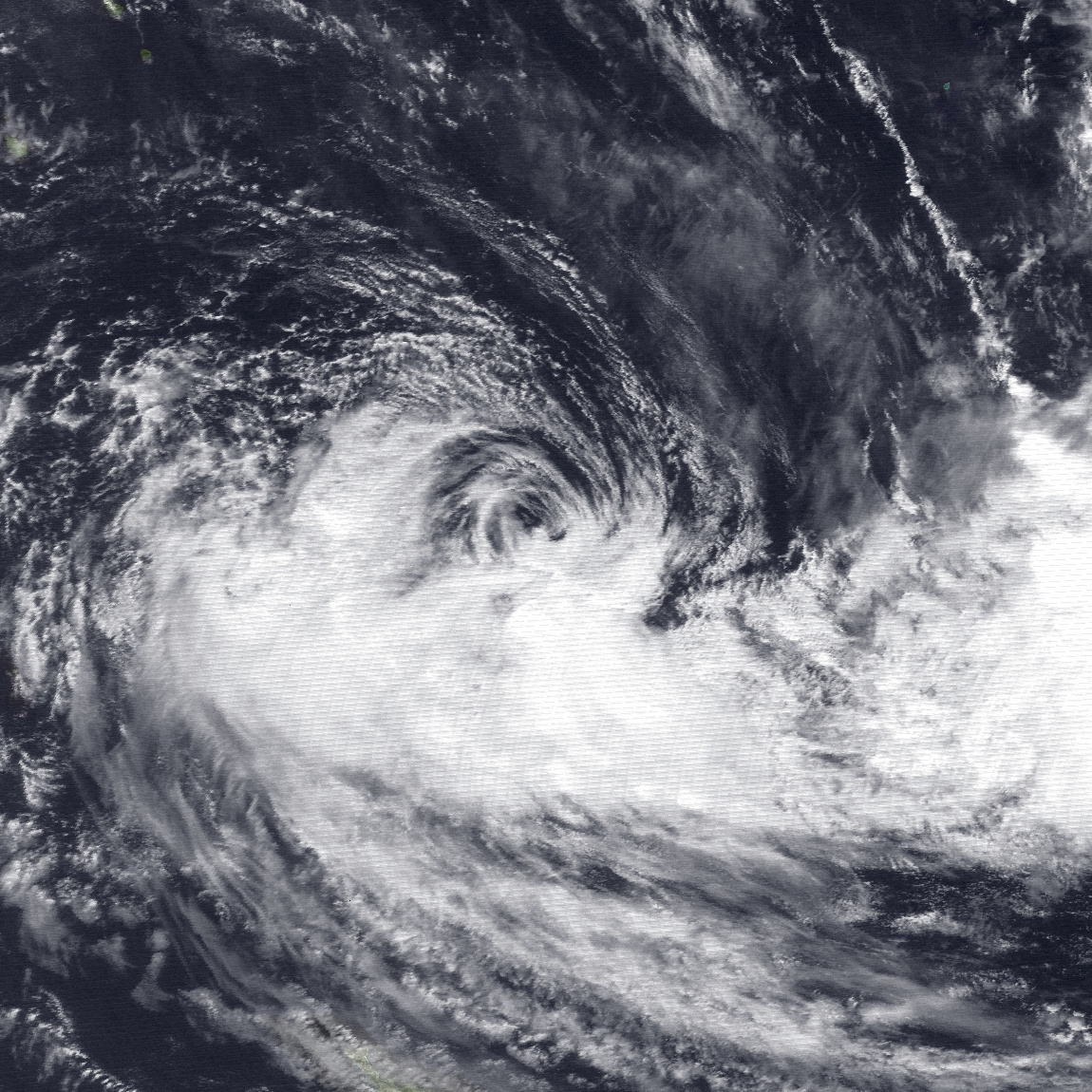
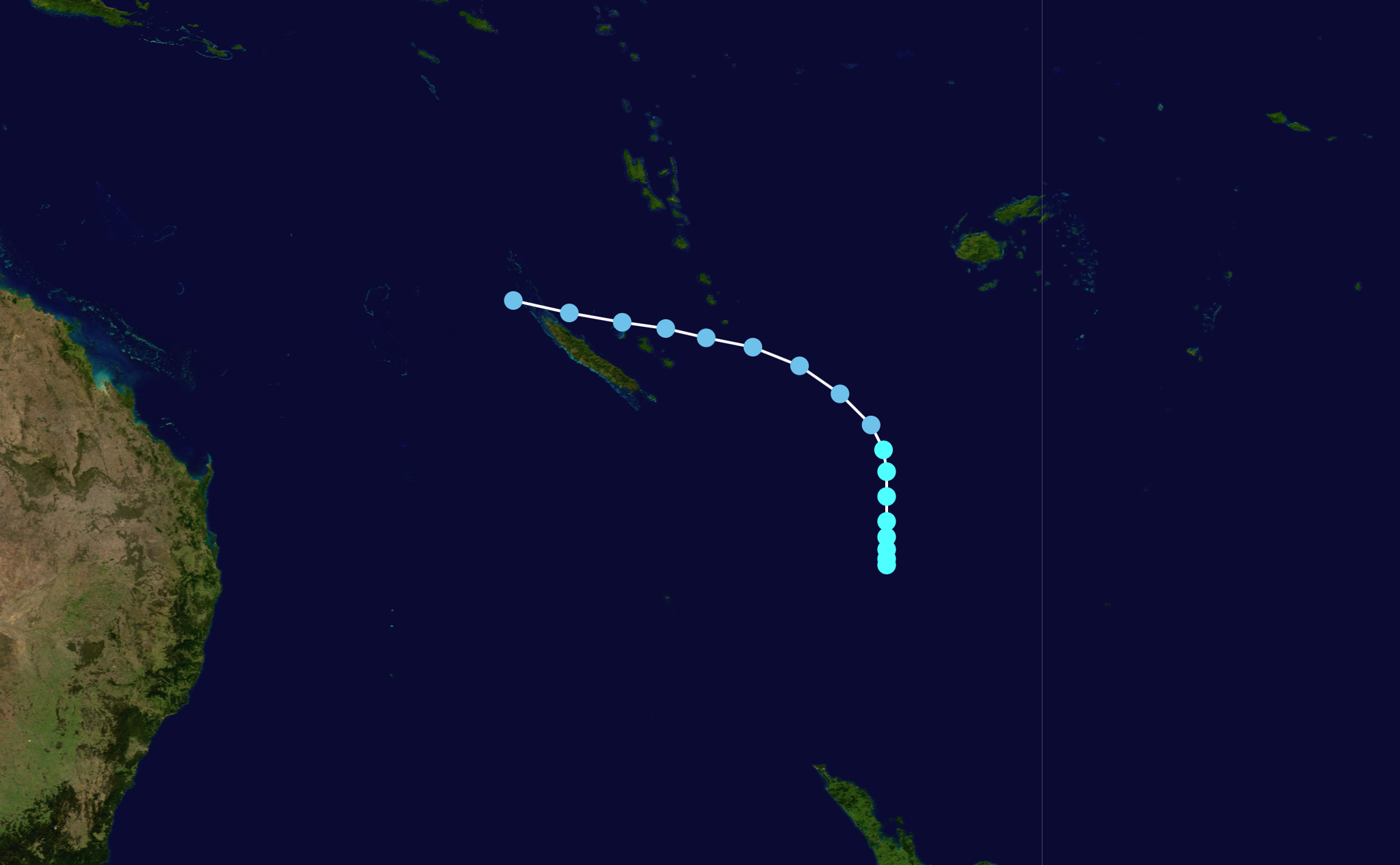
- Duration: February 20 – February 24
- Peak intensity: 85 km/h (50 mph) (10-min); 987 hPa (mbar)

An unnamed tropical cyclone existed from February 20 to February 24.

=== Tropical Cyclone Cyril ===
- Category 1 tropical cyclone (Australian scale)
- Tropical storm (SSHWS)
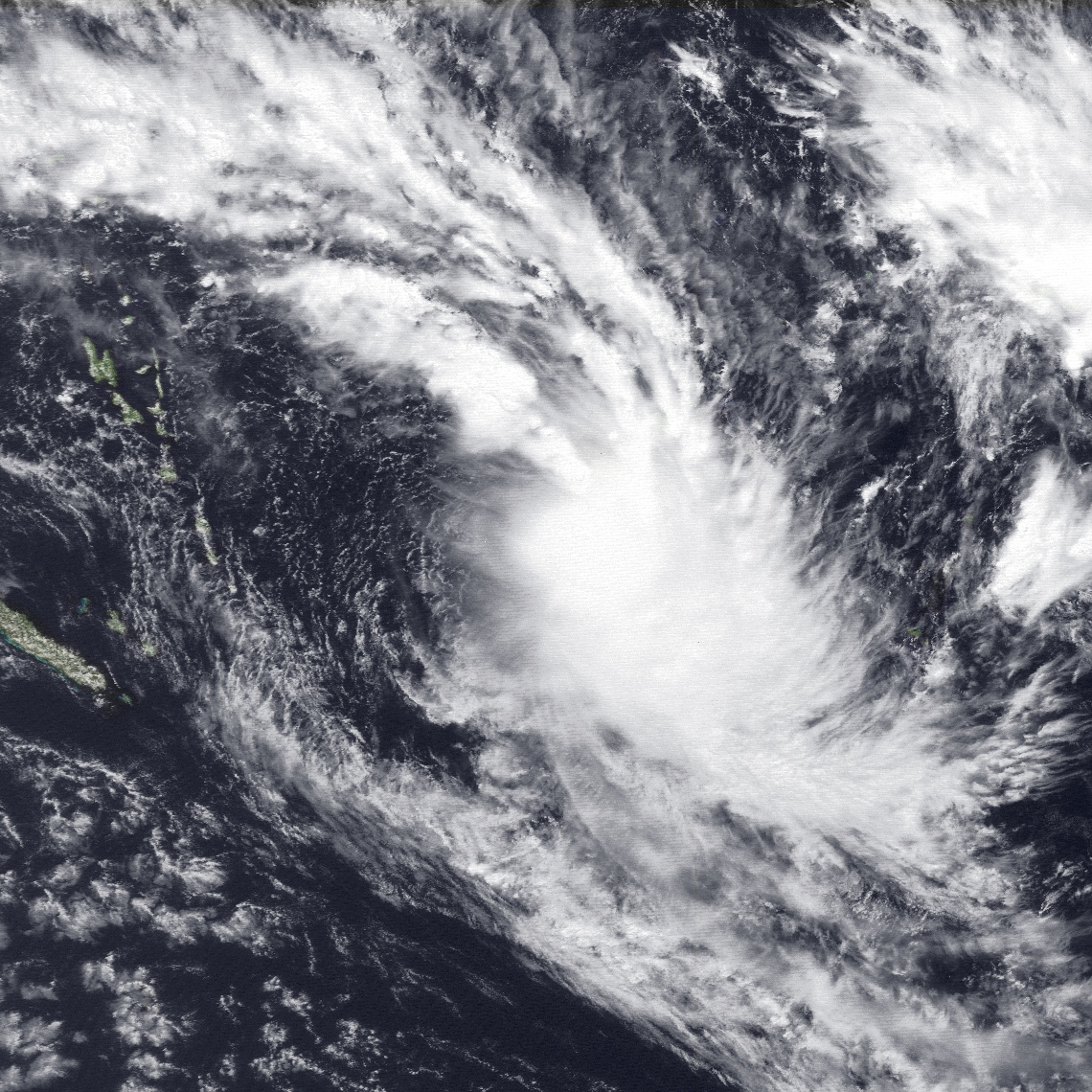
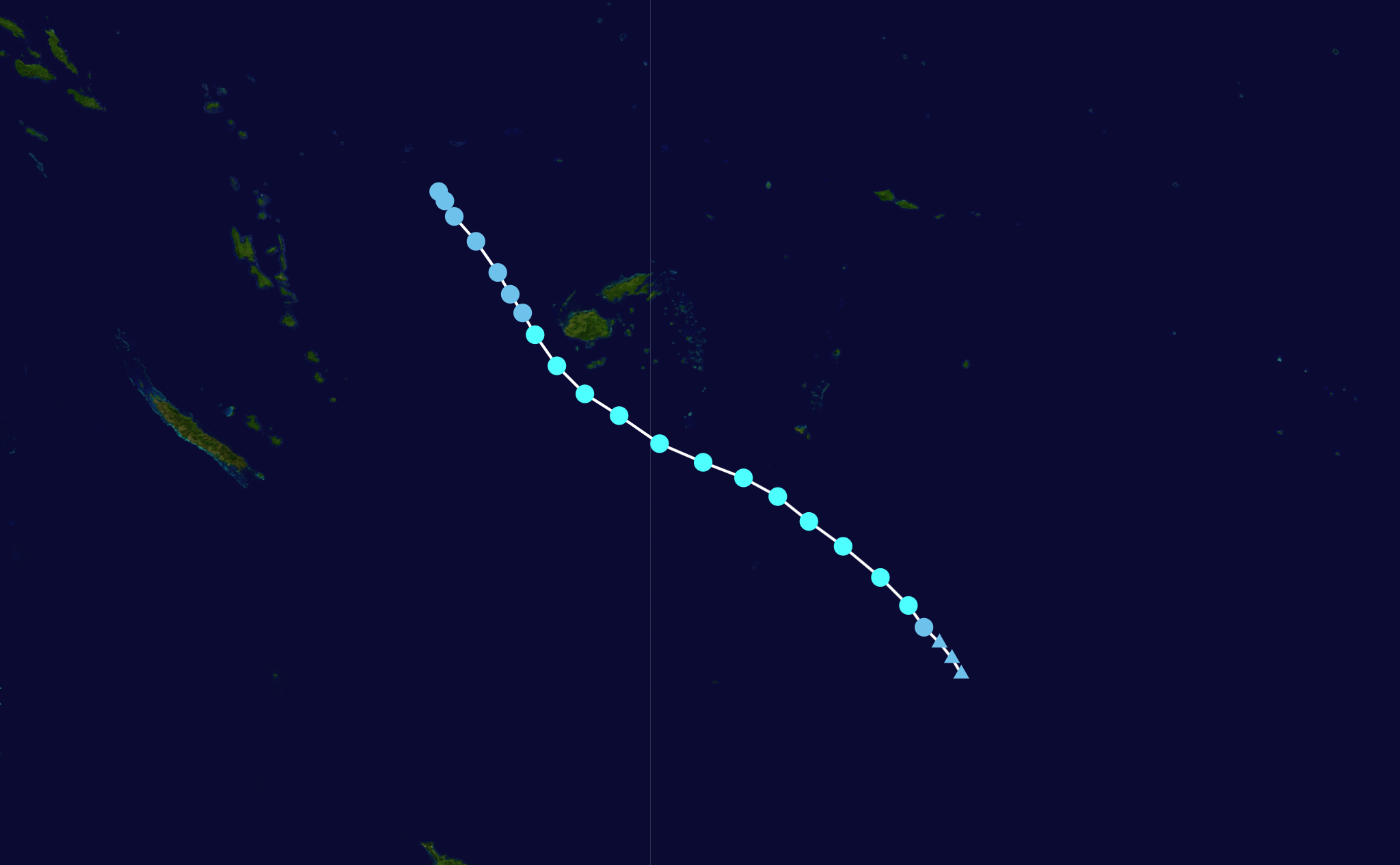
- Duration: March 16 – March 21
- Peak intensity: 85 km/h (50 mph) (10-min); 987 hPa (mbar)

During March 16, a shallow tropical depression developed within the monsoon trough of low pressure about 531 km (330 mi) to the northwest of Nadi, Fiji. Over the next day the system moved south-eastwards, but there was no evidence of the system developing, with only small changes observed on successive satellite images. However, the system was named Cyril by the FMS during March 17, after a couple of satellite images, revealed more prominent cloud banding and a larger convective overcast around the systems centre. The system subsequently peaked with 10-minute sustained winds of 45 knots during the next day, before it started to accelerate south-eastwards and rapidly weaken. The system was last noted during March 21, while it was located about

Cyril caused significant flooding within Fiji's Northern and Western divisions, with a peak of 5.62 m (18.4 ft) reported during March 18 within the town of Nadi, while a small storm surge of 0.3 m (0.98 ft) was observed within Nadi's bay on the same day.

=== Unnamed tropical cyclone ===
- Category 1 tropical cyclone (Australian scale)
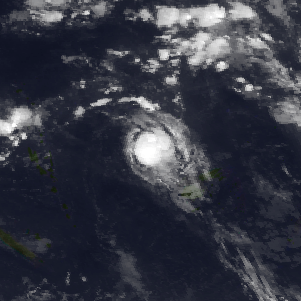
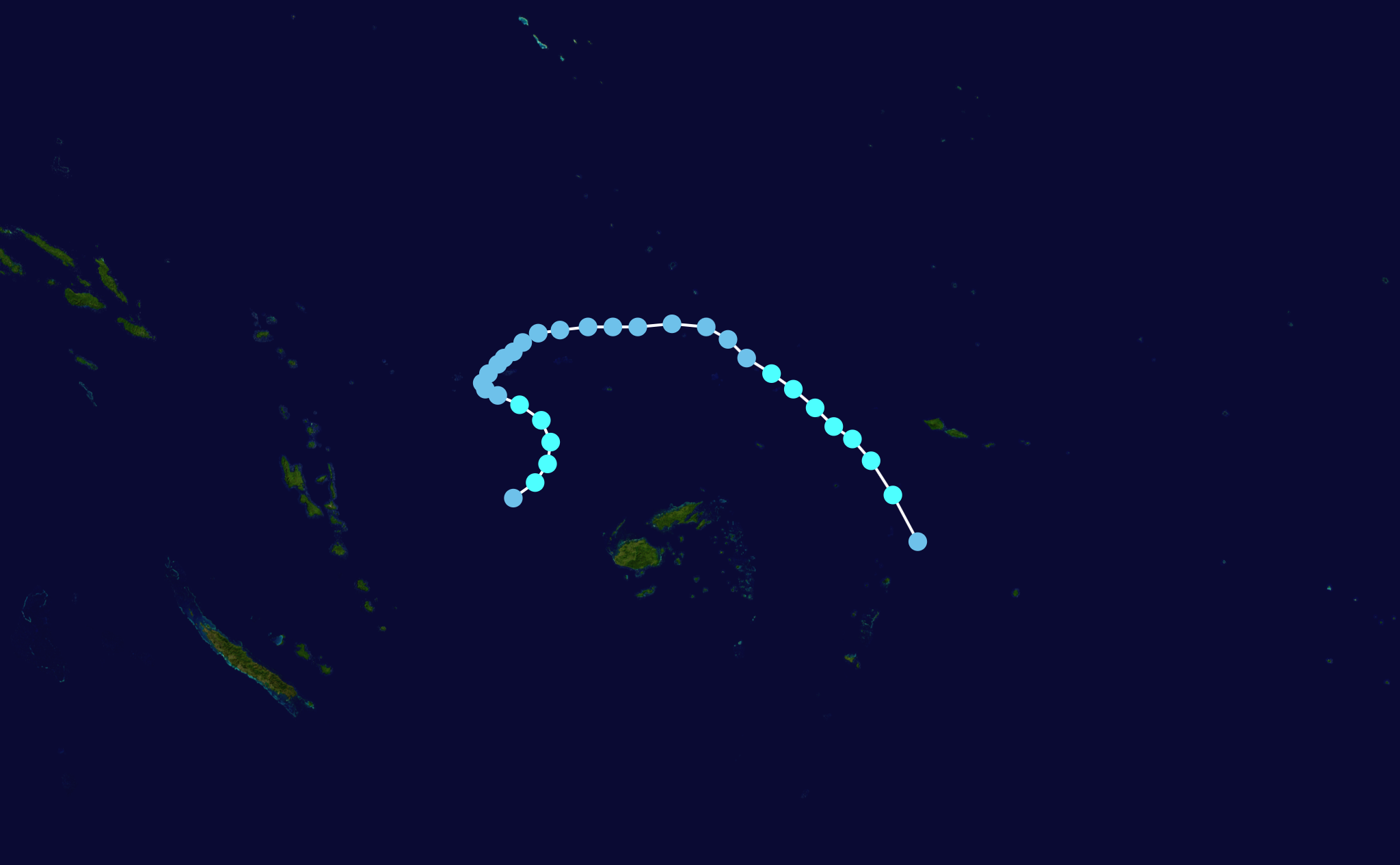
- Duration: March 23 – March 30
- Peak intensity: 75 km/h (45 mph) (10-min); 990 hPa (mbar)

Another unnamed tropical cyclone existed from March 23 to March 30.

=== Other systems ===
During January 18, Tropical Cyclone Grace moved into the basin from the Australian region, where it lost its tropical characteristics and weakened below tropical cyclone intensity. The system subsequently moved westwards before it was last noted, to the south-east of New Caledonia during January 21.

The remnant low of Cyclone Ingrid moved into the basin during February 25, before it was last noted by TCWC Nadi during February 27, about 400 km (250 mi) to the northeast of Brisbane Australia.

== Season effects ==
This table lists all the storms that developed in the South Pacific basin during the 1983–84 season. It includes their intensity on the Australian Tropical cyclone intensity scale, duration, name, areas affected, deaths, and damages.

Name	Dates	Peak intensity			Areas affected	Damage (USD)	Deaths	Refs
Name	Dates	Category	Wind speed	Pressure	Areas affected	Damage (USD)	Deaths	Refs
Atu	December 27–30	Category 1 tropical cyclone	85 km/h (50 mph)	987 hPa (29.15 inHg)				
Grace	January 18 – 20, 1984	Category 1 tropical cyclone	65 km/h (40 mph)	997 hPa (29.44 inHg)	None	None	None	
Beti	January 30 – February 5, 1984	Category 3 severe tropical cyclone	120 km/h (75 mph)	970 hPa (28.64 inHg)	New Caledonia	None	None	
Harvey	February 7–8	Category 2 tropical cyclone	100 km/h (65 mph)	980 hPa (28.94 inHg)	New Caledonia	None	None	
Unnamed	February 20–24	Category 1 tropical cyclone	85 km/h (50 mph)	987 hPa (29.15 inHg)	None	None	None	
Cyril	March 16–21	Category 1 tropical cyclone	85 km/h (50 mph)	987 hPa (29.15 inHg)	Fiji	Minor	None	
Unnamed	March 23–30	Category 1 tropical cyclone	75 km/h (45 mph)	990 hPa (29.23 inHg)				
Season aggregates
7 systems	December 27 – March 30		120 km/h (75 mph)	970 hPa (28.64 inHg)		Unknown	Unknown	
