= 1983–84 Australian region cyclone season =

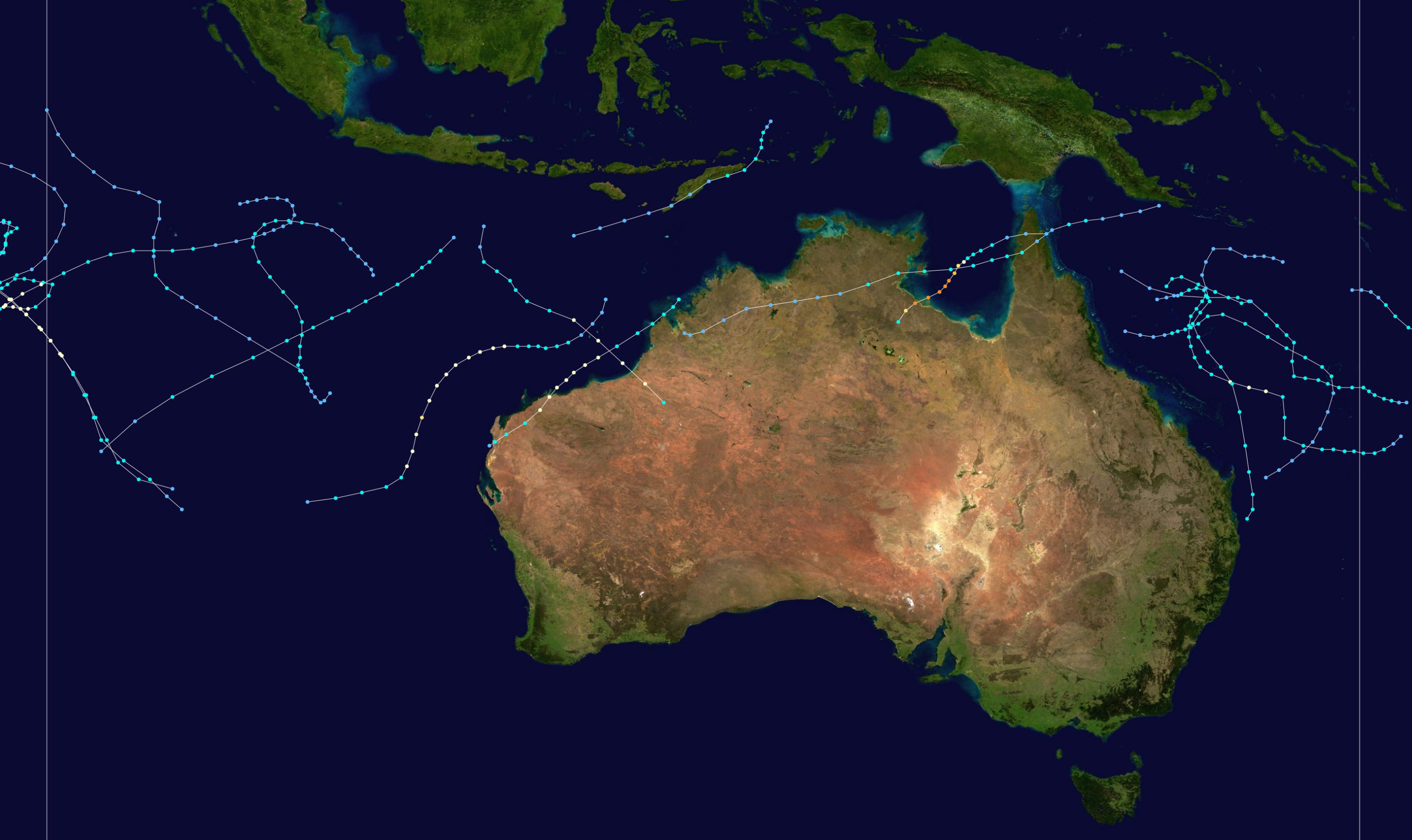
- Season summary map

Seasonal boundaries
- First system formed: 11 July 1983
- Last system dissipated: 7 April 1984

Strongest storm
- Name: Kathy
  - Maximum winds: 205 km/h (125 mph) (10-minute sustained)
  - Lowest pressure: 916 hPa (mbar)

Seasonal statistics
- Tropical lows: 22
- Tropical cyclones: 20 official, 1 unofficial (record high)
- Severe tropical cyclones: 12 (record high)
- Total fatalities: 1
- Total damage: $19 million (1984 USD)

Related articles
- 1983–84 South-West Indian Ocean cyclone season; 1983–84 South Pacific cyclone season

The 1983–84 Australian region cyclone season was the most active season on record, with a total of 22 tropical lows, 20 tropical cyclones and 12 severe tropical cyclones. It officially started on 1 November 1983, and officially ended on 30 April 1984. The strongest of the storms was Cyclone Kathy, a small but powerful storm, which reached wind gusts up to 280 km/h (175 mph) and had barometric pressure peaking at 916 hPa. Kathy also caused about 60% of known damage from the season, US$11.4 million out of the $19 million. The only known casualty of the season was also directly caused by Kathy. The longest-lived storm from the season was Cyclone Daryl, that lived for 17 days in total.

== Systems ==
=== Cyclone 01S ===
- Tropical storm (SSHWS)
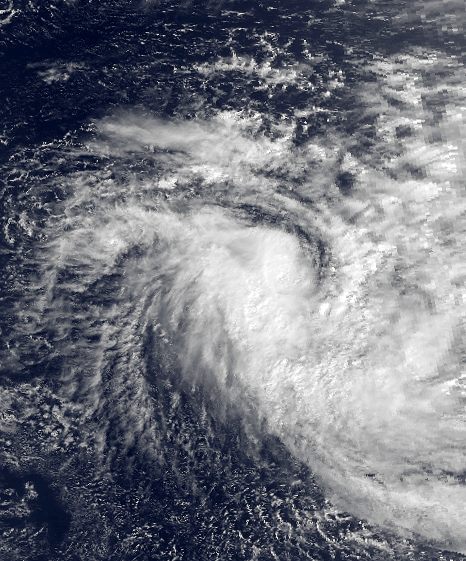
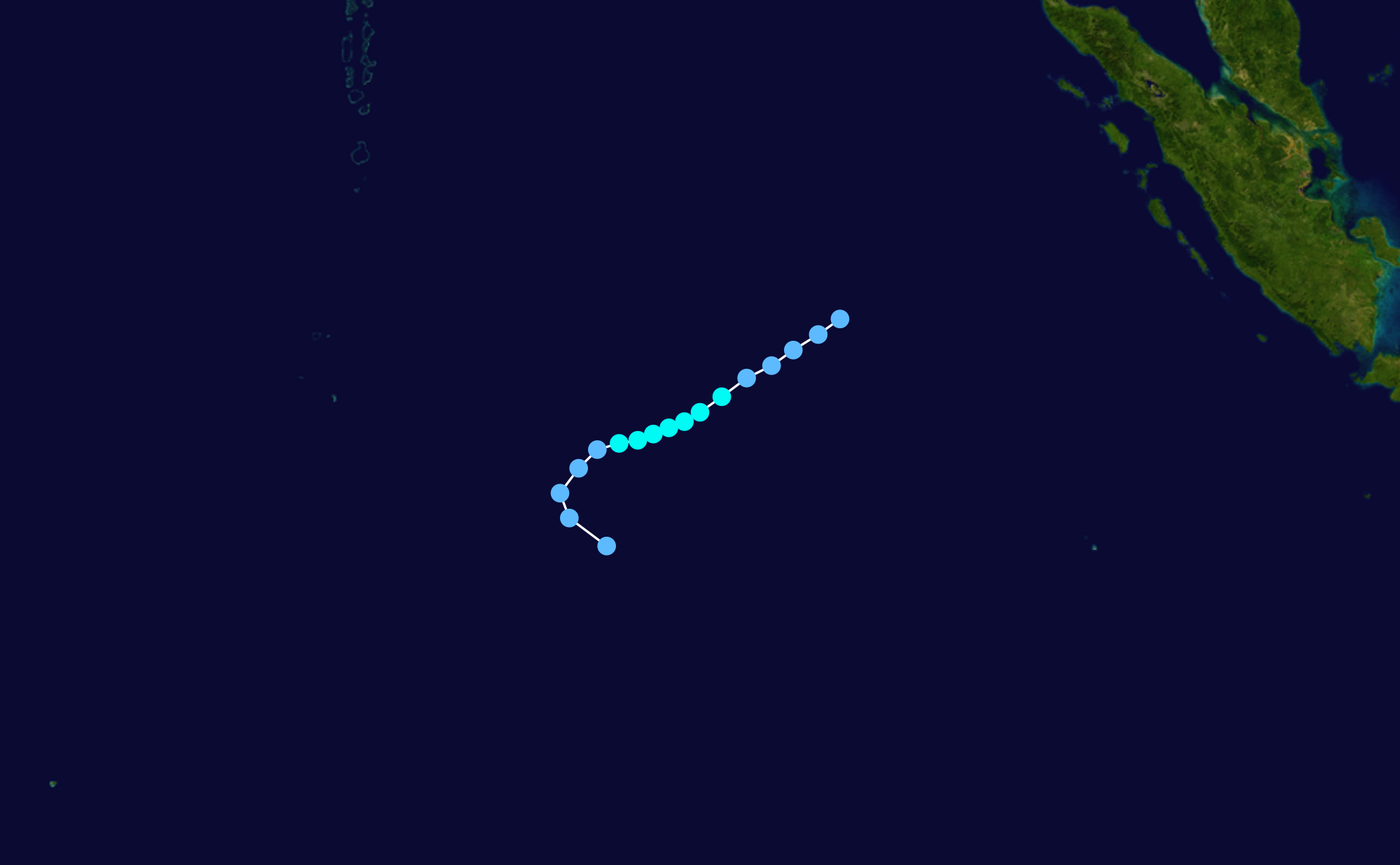
- Duration: 11 July – 15 July
- Peak intensity: 65 km/h (40 mph) (1-min); 1000 hPa (mbar)

Cyclone 01S existed over the northwestern areas of the Australian region basin from 11 July to 15 July, unusually early for a tropical cyclone in the basin.

=== Severe Tropical Cyclone Oscar ===
- Category 3 severe tropical cyclone (Australian scale)
- Category 1 tropical cyclone (SSHWS)
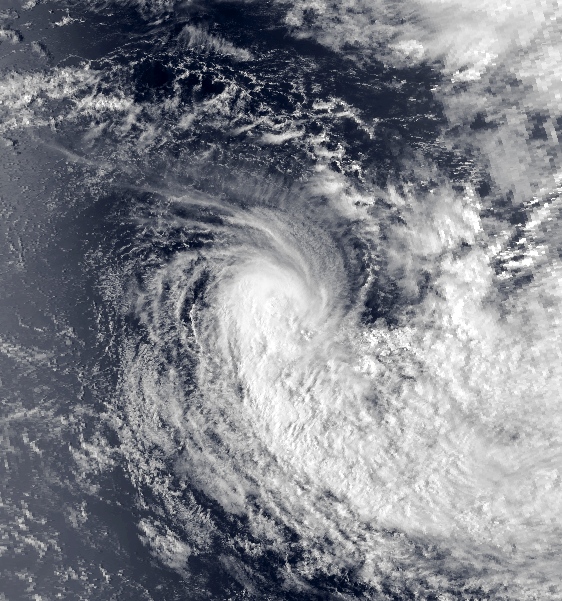
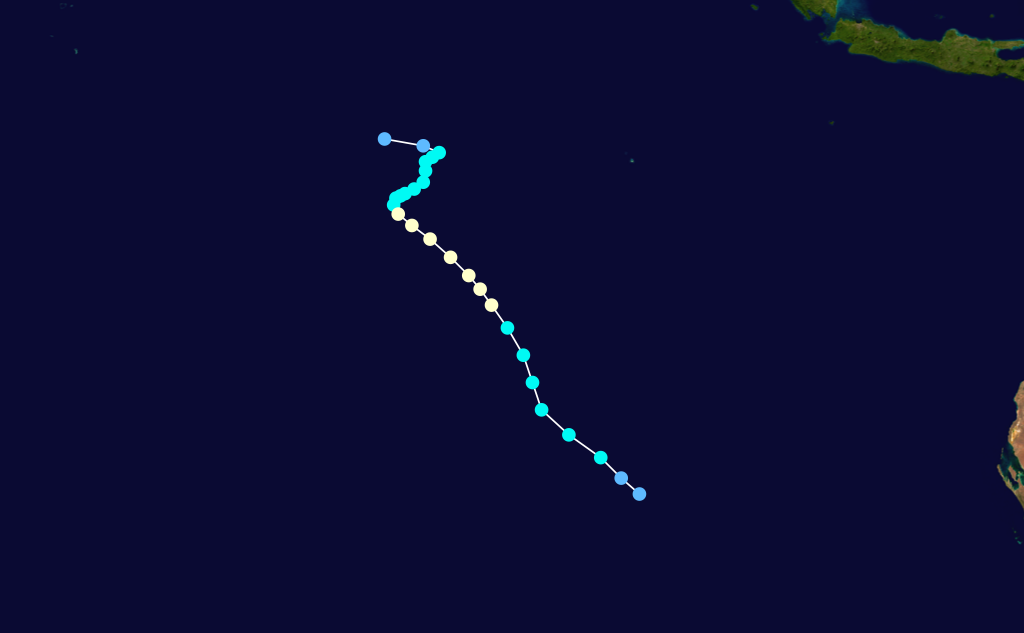
- Duration: 22 October – 1 November
- Peak intensity: 130 km/h (80 mph) (10-min); 972 hPa (mbar)

Oscar developed from a low-pressure area to the northwest of the Cocos Islands on 22 October. The storm moved generally southward for several days before dissipating on 1 November.

=== Tropical Low Pearl ===
- Tropical low (Australian scale)
- Tropical storm (SSHWS)
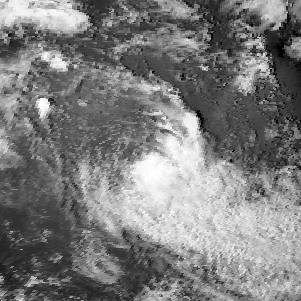
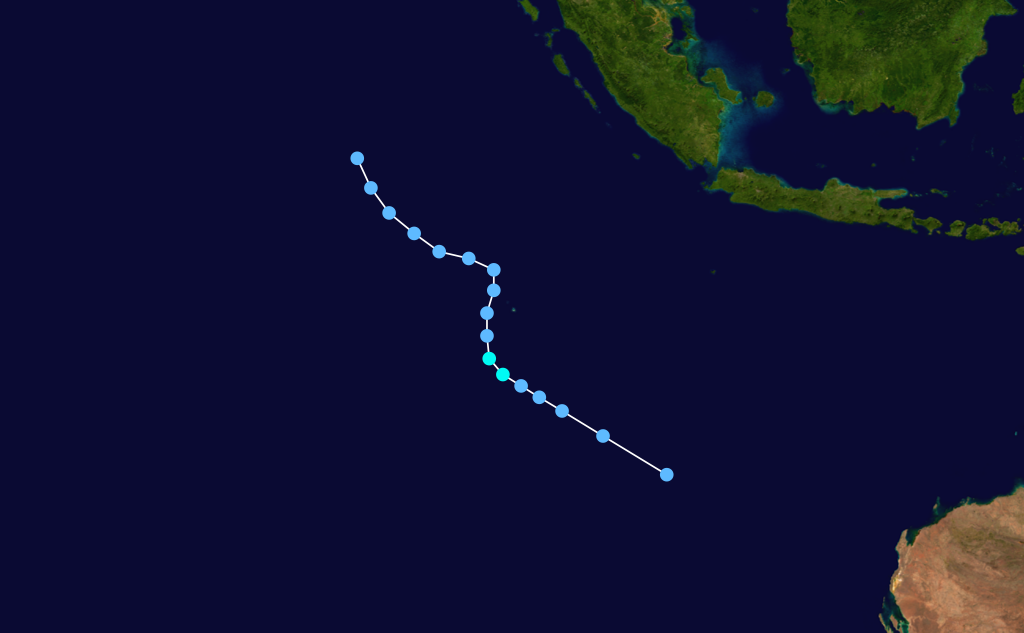
- Duration: 11 November – 14 November
- Peak intensity: 60 km/h (35 mph) (10-min); 997 hPa (mbar)

A low pressure developed into Pearl on 11 November. The system tracked southeastward and ceased to exist on 14 November. It was classified as a tropical cyclone at the time until post-analysis indicated it remained a tropical low.

=== Severe Tropical Cyclone Quenton ===
- Category 4 severe tropical cyclone (Australian scale)
- Category 1 tropical cyclone (SSHWS)
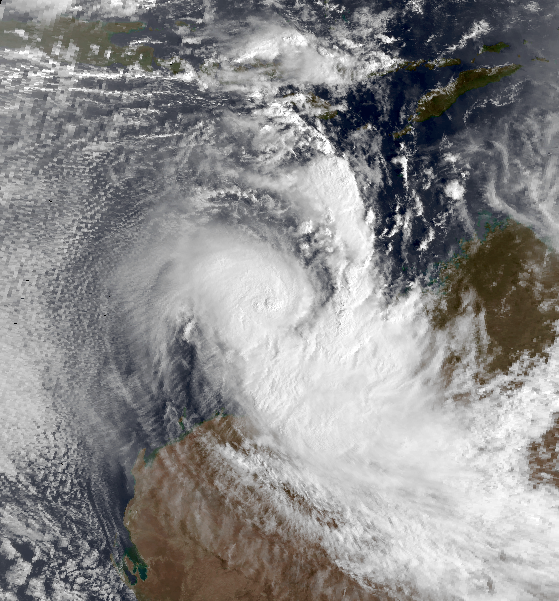
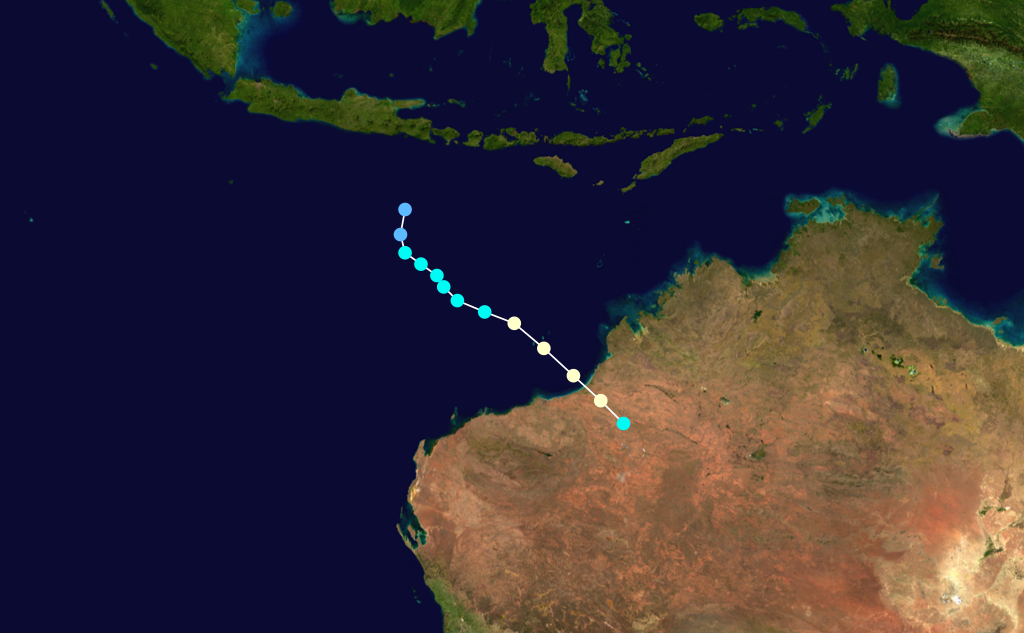
- Duration: 26 November – 30 November
- Peak intensity: 165 km/h (105 mph) (10-min); 955 hPa (mbar)

Quenton developed on 26 November from a low pressure situated south of Java. Making landfall in Western Australia on 29 November, Quenton was the first tropical cyclone to strike Australia in the month of November since Ines in 1973. The cyclone dissipated on the following day.

=== Tropical Cyclone Fritz ===
- Category 1 tropical cyclone (Australian scale)
- Tropical storm (SSHWS)
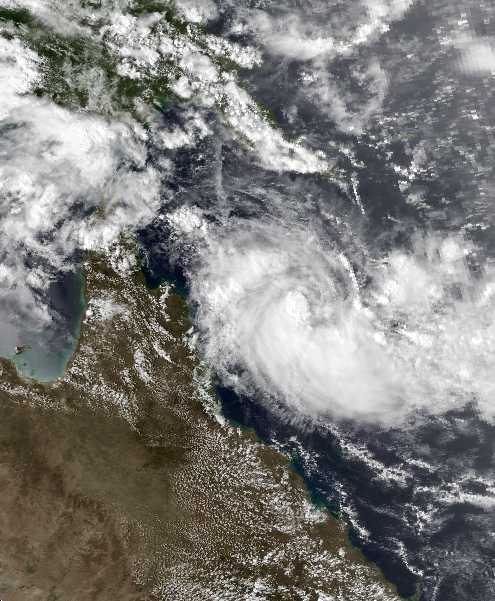
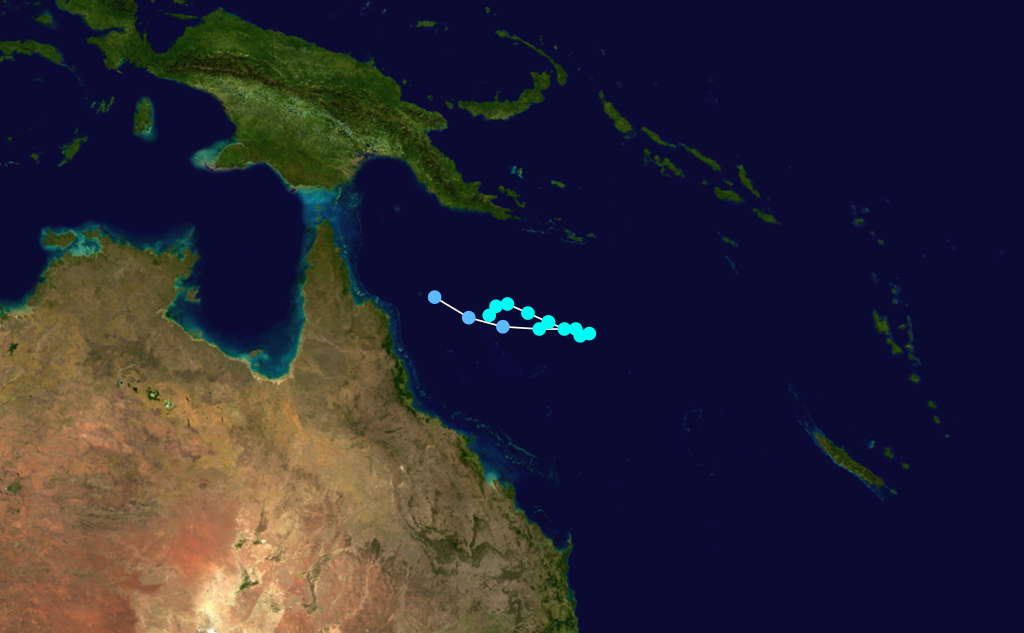
- Duration: 9 December – 13 December
- Peak intensity: 85 km/h (50 mph) (10-min); 992 hPa (mbar)

On 9 December, Fritz developed from a low-pressure area to the northwest of Willis Island. Fritz meandered erratically until dissipating on 13 December.

=== Tropical Cyclone Esther ===
- Category 2 tropical cyclone (Australian scale)
- Tropical storm (SSHWS)
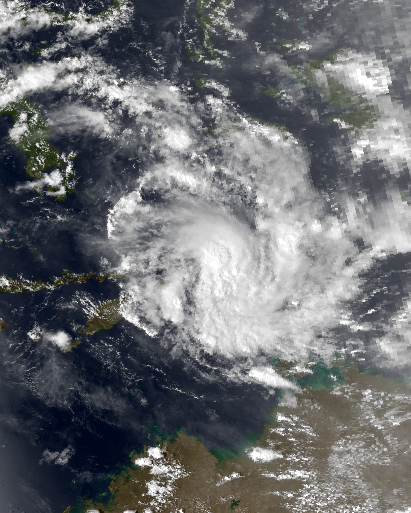
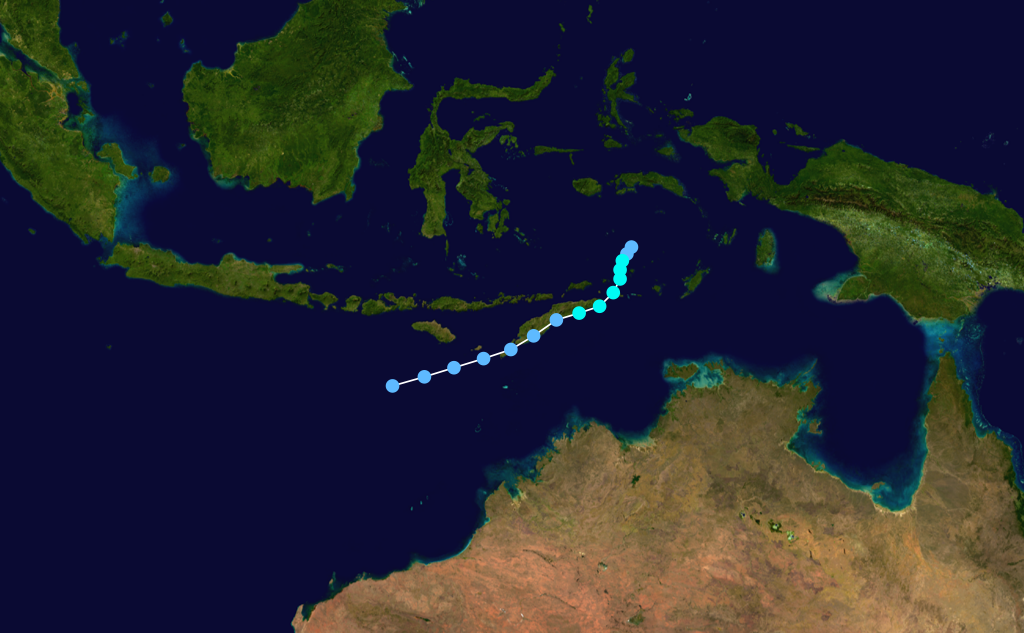
- Duration: 19 December – 21 December
- Peak intensity: 95 km/h (60 mph) (10-min); 990 hPa (mbar)

A small, weak tropical low, later named Esther, developed over the Banda Sea on 19 December. Esther struck Babar Island and then dissipated on 21 December.

=== Tropical Cyclone 06U ===
- Category 1 tropical cyclone (Australian scale)
- Tropical storm (SSHWS)
- Duration: 21 December – 24 December
- Peak intensity: 70 km/h (45 mph) (10-min); 994 hPa (mbar)

Operationally, this cyclone was considered to have been the redeveloped remnants of Esther. The storm developed from a cloud cluster near the southern tip of Timor on 21 December. The system moved west-northward and dissipated on 24 December.

=== Tropical Cyclone Sharon ===
- Category 2 tropical cyclone (Australian scale)
- Tropical storm (SSHWS)
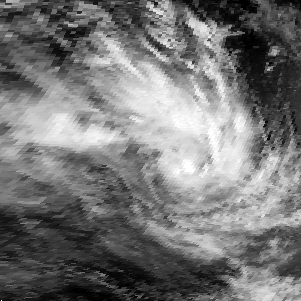
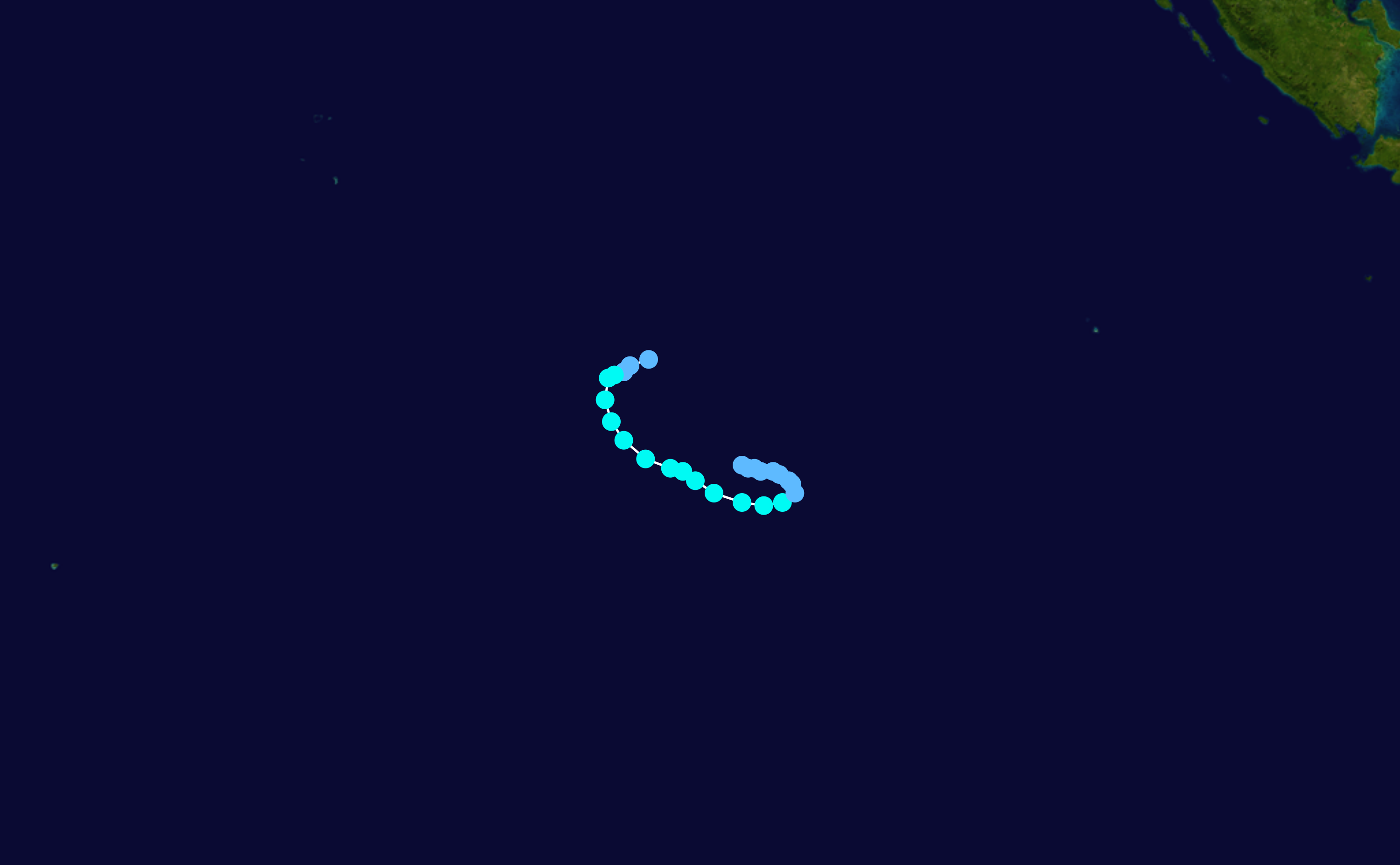
- Duration: 25 December – 31 December
- Peak intensity: 100 km/h (60 mph) (10-min); 984 hPa (mbar)

A low-pressure area rapidly developed into Tropical Cyclone Sharon on 25 December. Sharon existed west of 90°E, which is now the western boundary of the Australian region basin. The storm dissipated on 31 December.

=== Tropical Cyclone Tim ===
- Category 2 tropical cyclone (Australian scale)
- Tropical storm (SSHWS)
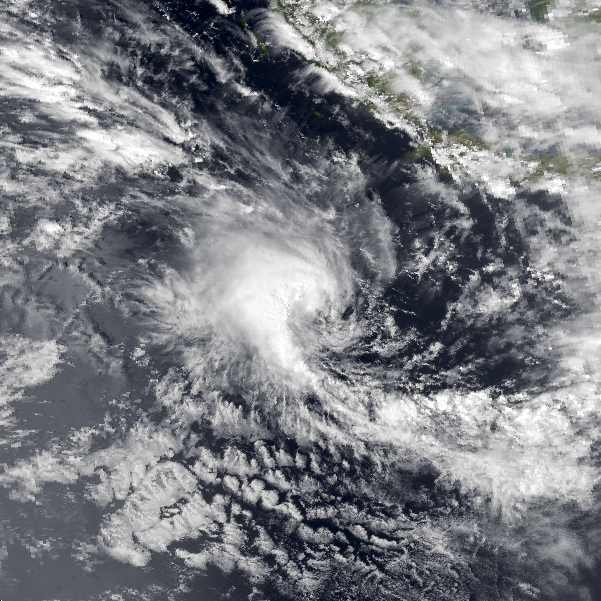
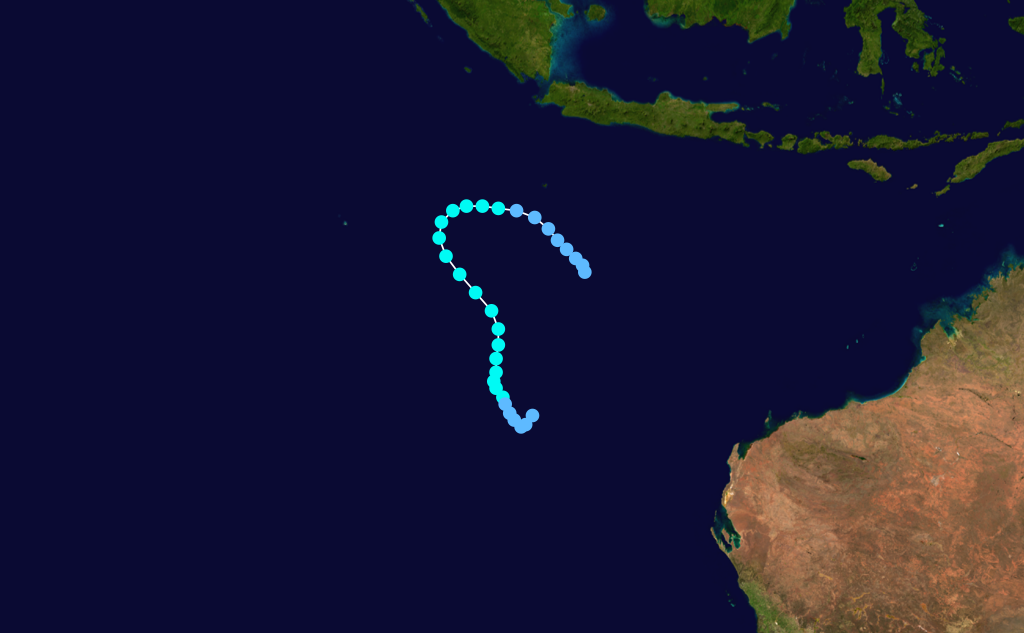
- Duration: 2 January – 10 January
- Peak intensity: 100 km/h (65 mph) (10-min); 980 hPa (mbar)

Tim formed from a low-pressure area to the southeast of Christmas Island on 2 January 1984. After moving northwest, Tim turned southward on 6 January. The cyclone decayed to a tropical low by 10 January.

=== Severe Tropical Cyclone Grace ===
- Category 3 severe tropical cyclone (Australian scale)
- Category 1 tropical cyclone (SSHWS)
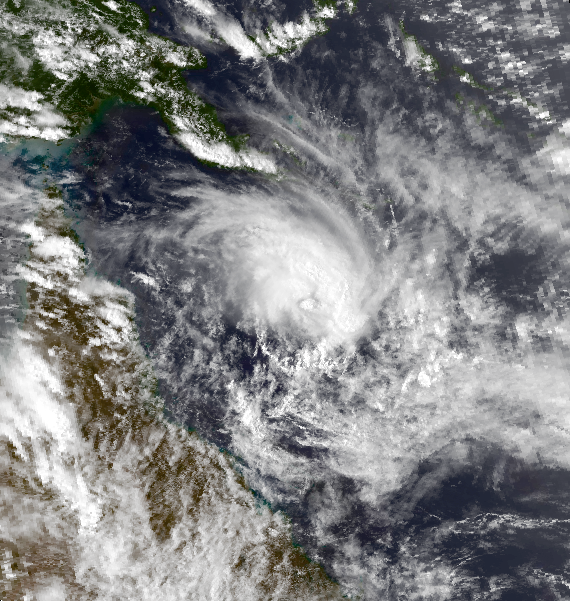
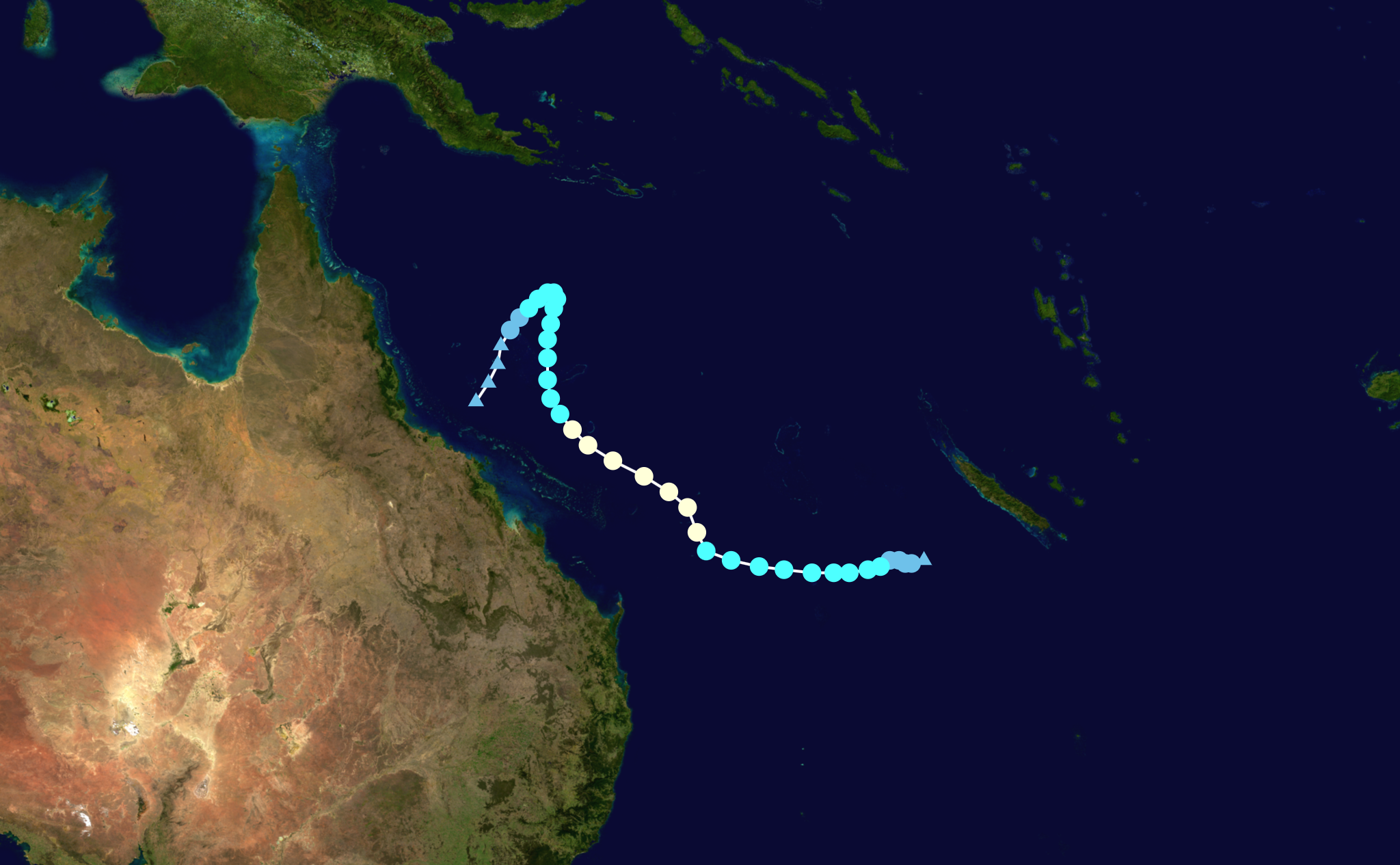
- Duration: 11 January – 20 January
- Peak intensity: 130 km/h (80 mph) (10-min); 970 hPa (mbar)

A weak area of low pressure developed east of Queensland on January 11. The tropical disturbance moved northeastward over the Coral Sea and gradually became better organized. On January 13 it turned to the south and intensified into a tropical cyclone the next day. In a favorable environment for intensification, Grace strengthened on January 15 and 16, developing a ragged eye as seen on the satellite images. On January 16 became a severe tropical cyclone and reached its lowest estimated pressure of 970 mb. Also on January 16, a weather station on Frederick Reef reported maximum winds of 130 km/h. On January 17, upper-level shear increased over the circulation and Grace became exposed as the tropical cyclone turned to the east. Weakening continued during the next few days and Grace decayed into a remnant low on January 21 while located southeast of Nouméa.

=== Severe Tropical Cyclone Vivienne-Fanja ===
- Category 3 severe tropical cyclone (Australian scale)
- Category 1 tropical cyclone (SSHWS)
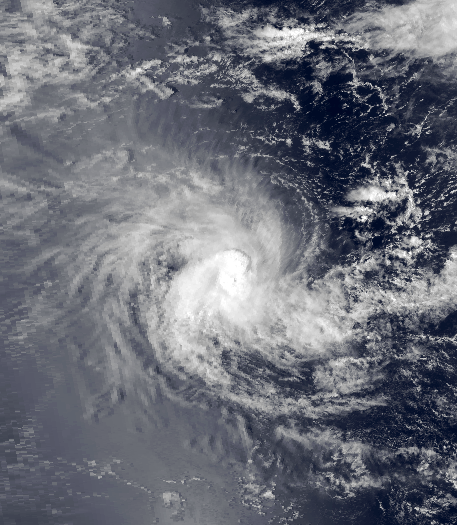
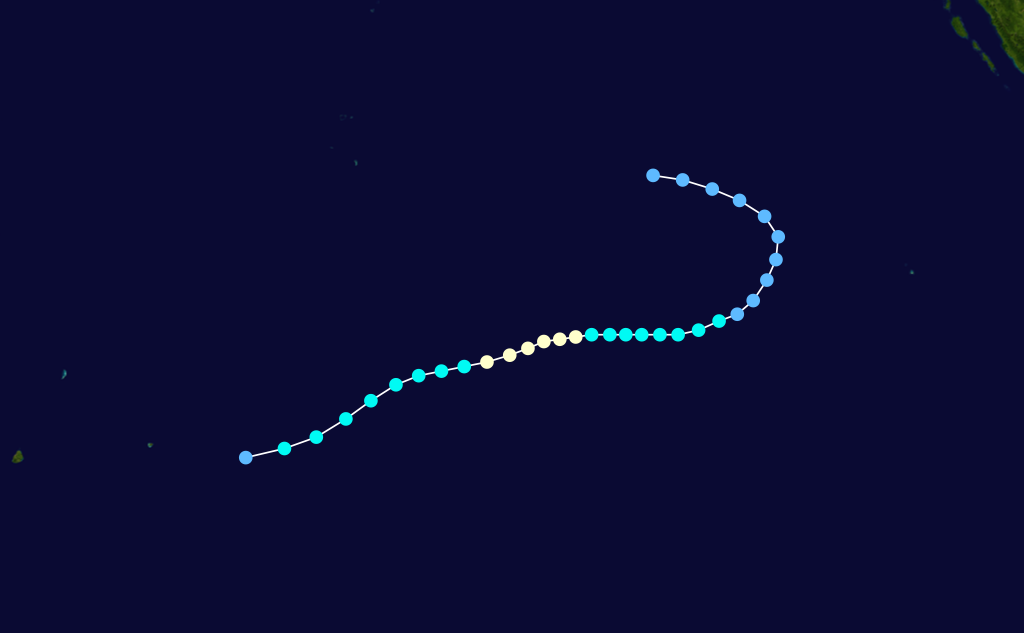
- Duration: 23 January – 27 January (Crossed 80°E)
- Peak intensity: 120 km/h (75 mph) (10-min); 975 hPa (mbar)

The origins of Vivienne-Fanja are unclear as a result of sparseness of data, due to a disruption in satellite imagery coverage. It is estimated that a tropical low formed on January 23 west of Christmas Island in the Australian basin. The Bureau of Meteorology named the storm Vivienne, which gradually intensified while moving to the west. On January 27, the cyclone crossed 80° E into the southwest Indian Ocean, at which time it was renamed Fanja.

=== Severe Tropical Cyclone Willy ===
- Category 3 severe tropical cyclone (Australian scale)
- Category 2 tropical cyclone (SSHWS)
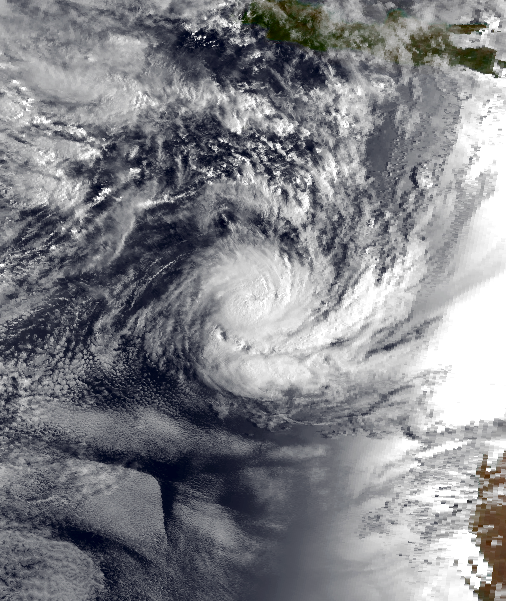
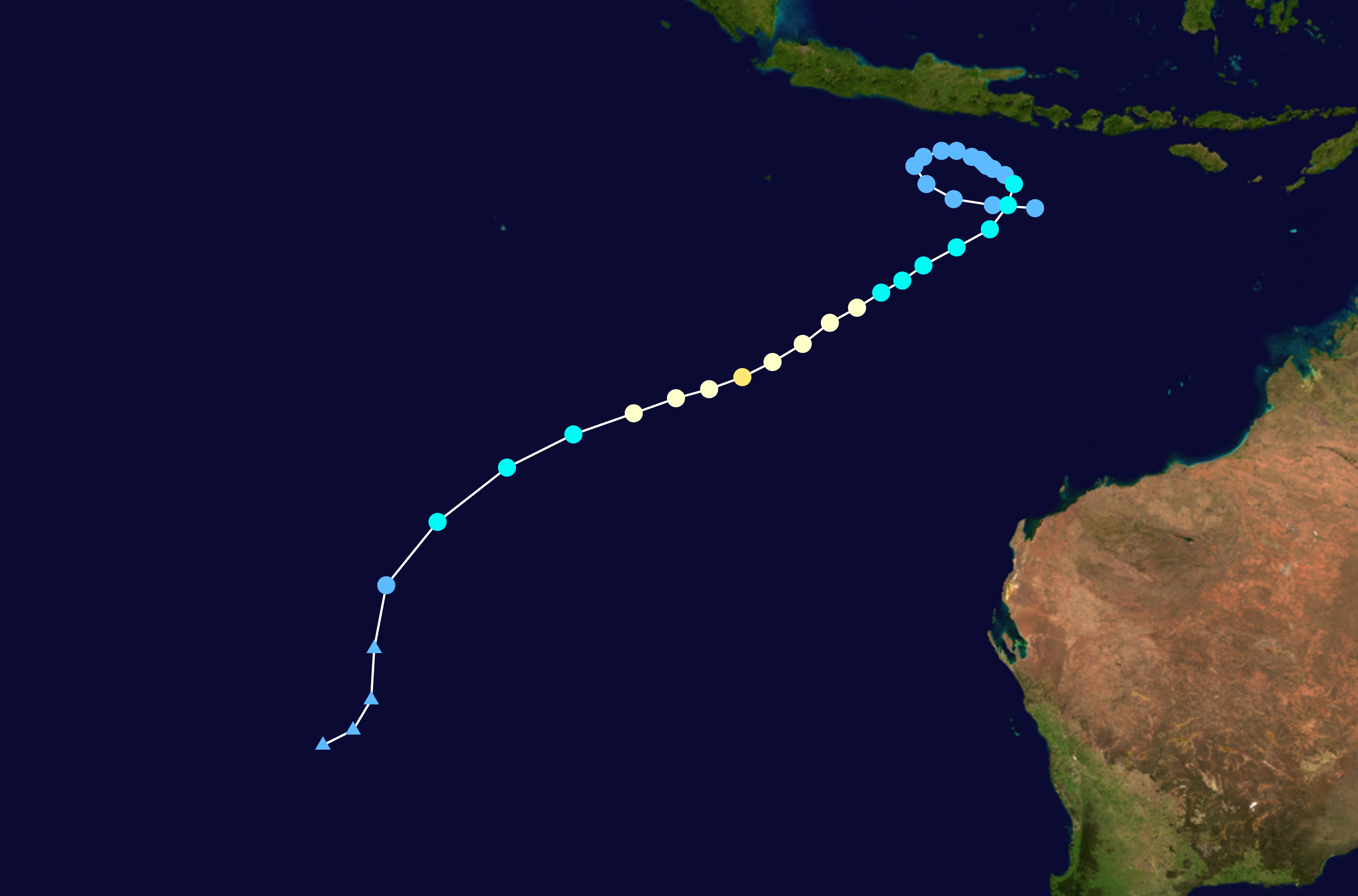
- Duration: 2 February – 11 February
- Peak intensity: 150 km/h (90 mph) (10-min); 960 hPa (mbar)

A weak area of low pressure developed south of Java along the monsoon trough on February 2. The system meandered for a few days while becoming better organized. Late on February 5, the Bureau of Meteorology upgraded the low pressure to tropical cyclone intensity. Willy moved southwestward starting on February 6 and continued to intensify. On February 7, Willy was upgraded to a severe tropical cyclone with an estimated central pressure of 975 mb. On February 8, Willy reached its peak with an estimated central pressure of 960 mb. Satellite images showed a well-organized tropical cyclone and an eye was intermittently visible. Strong wind shear caused Willy to quickly lose strength and it weakened below tropical cyclone intensity late on February 9. Early on February 11, Willy dissipated.

=== Severe Tropical Cyclone Annette-Jaminy ===
- Category 3 severe tropical cyclone (Australian scale)
- Category 2 tropical cyclone (SSHWS)
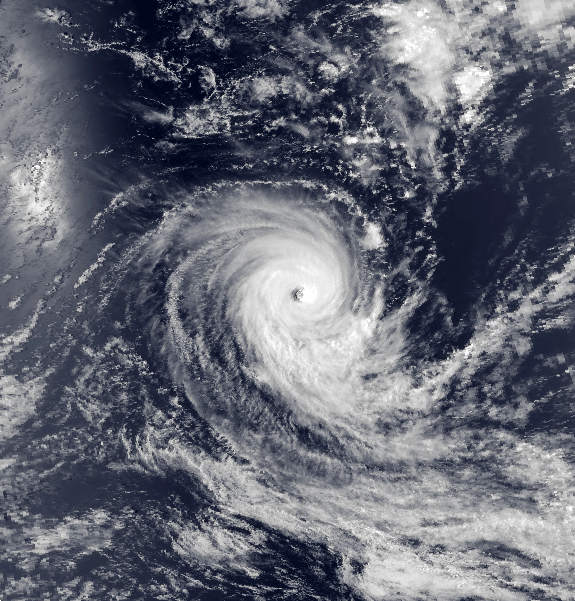
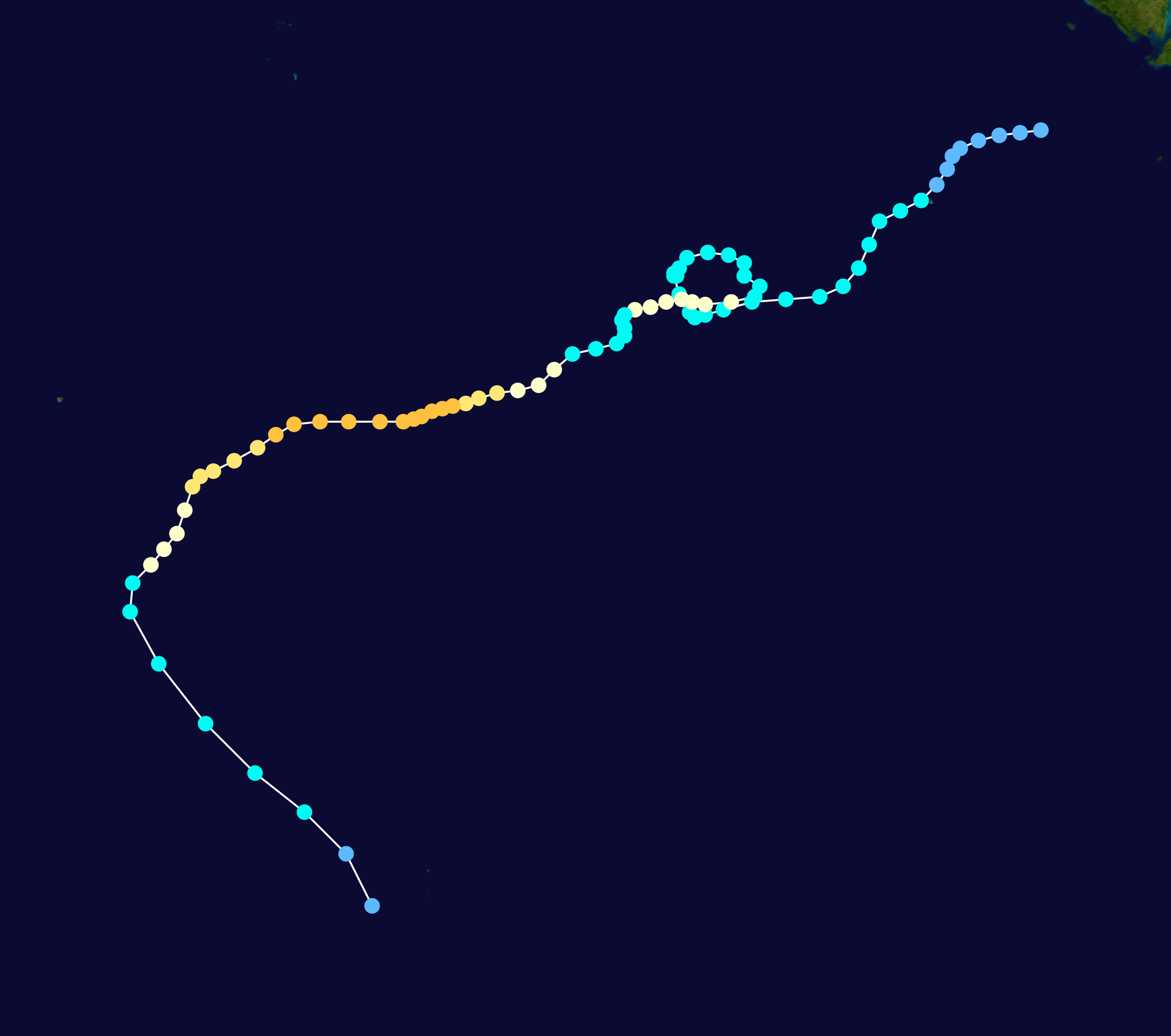
- Duration: 3 February – 16 February (Crossed 80°E)
- Peak intensity: 150 km/h (90 mph) (10-min); 960 hPa (mbar)

Cyclone Annette developed simultaneously with Cyclone Willy in the Australian basin and Cyclone Haja in the south-west Indian. On February 3, a tropical low formed northeast of the Cocos Islands. Steered by a ridge to the south, it moved generally southwestward and intensified into Tropical Cyclone Annette, named by the Bureau of Meteorology. After executing a loop, Annette crossed 80 E into the south-west Indian Ocean on February 16. Upon crossing into the basin, the storm was renamed Jaminy by the Mauritius Meteorological Service.

=== Tropical Cyclone Harvey ===
- Category 2 tropical cyclone (Australian scale)
- Tropical storm (SSHWS)
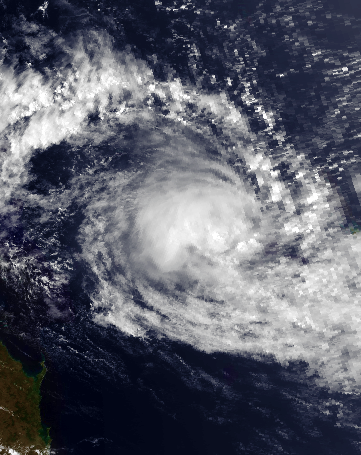
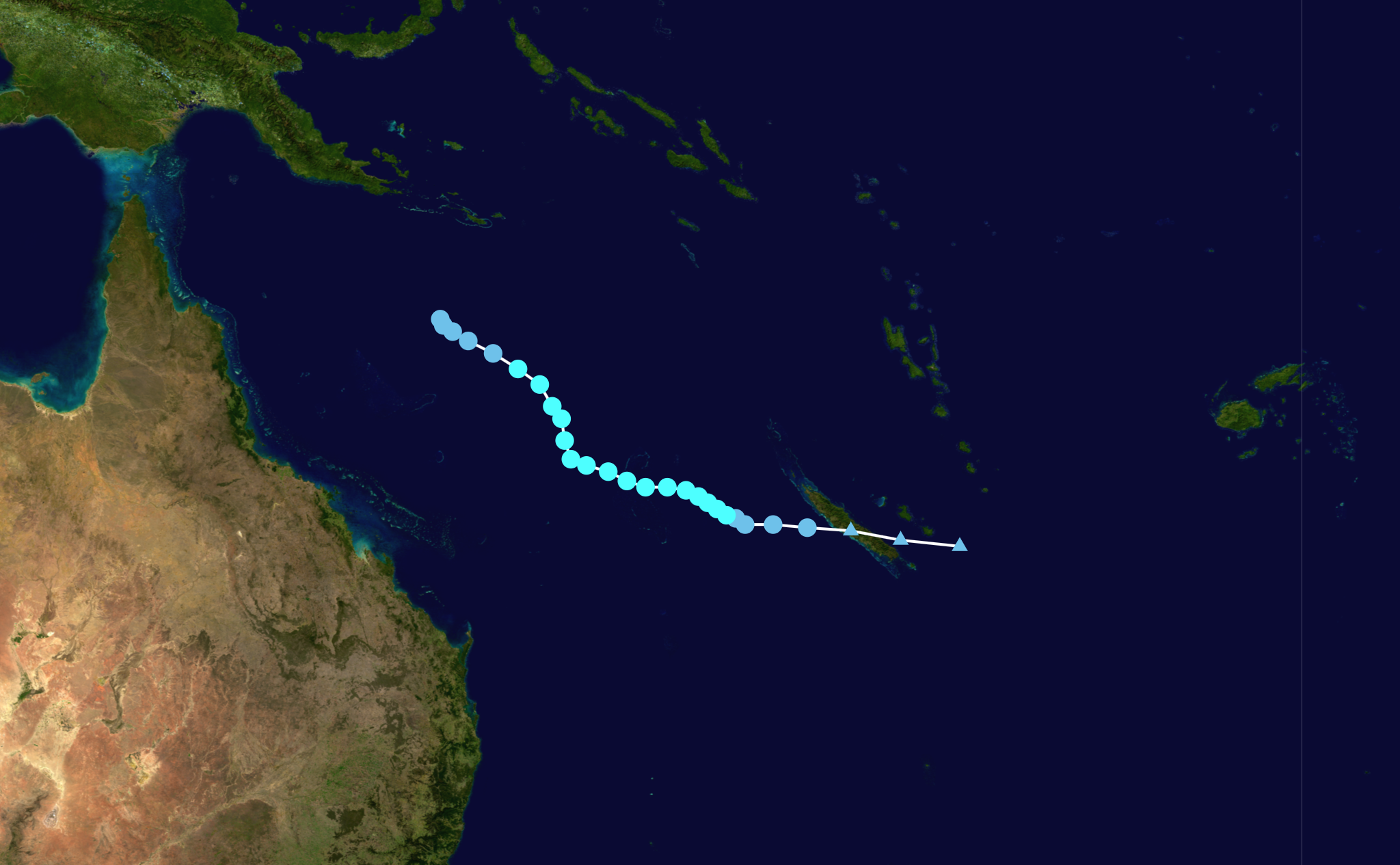
- Duration: 3 February – 7 February (Crossed 160°E)
- Peak intensity: 110 km/h (70 mph) (10-min); 980 hPa (mbar)

A low spawned within the monsoon trough developed into Tropical Cyclone Harvey on 3 February. The system moved generally east-southeastward and entered the South Pacific basin on 7 February.

=== Severe Tropical Cyclone Bobby ===
- Category 4 severe tropical cyclone (Australian scale)
- Category 2 tropical cyclone (SSHWS)
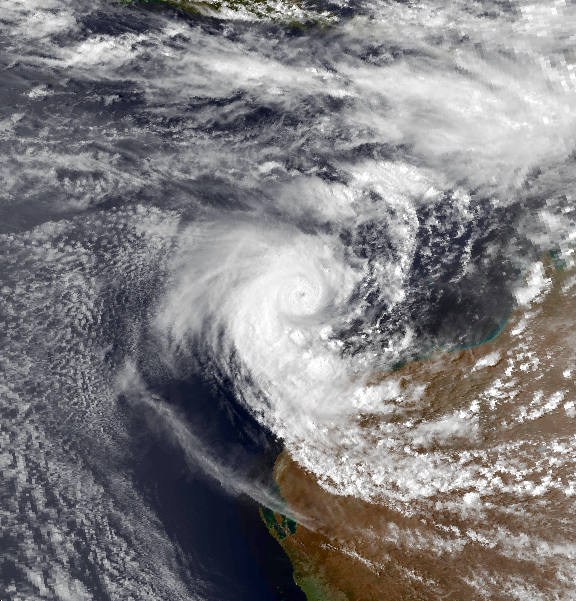
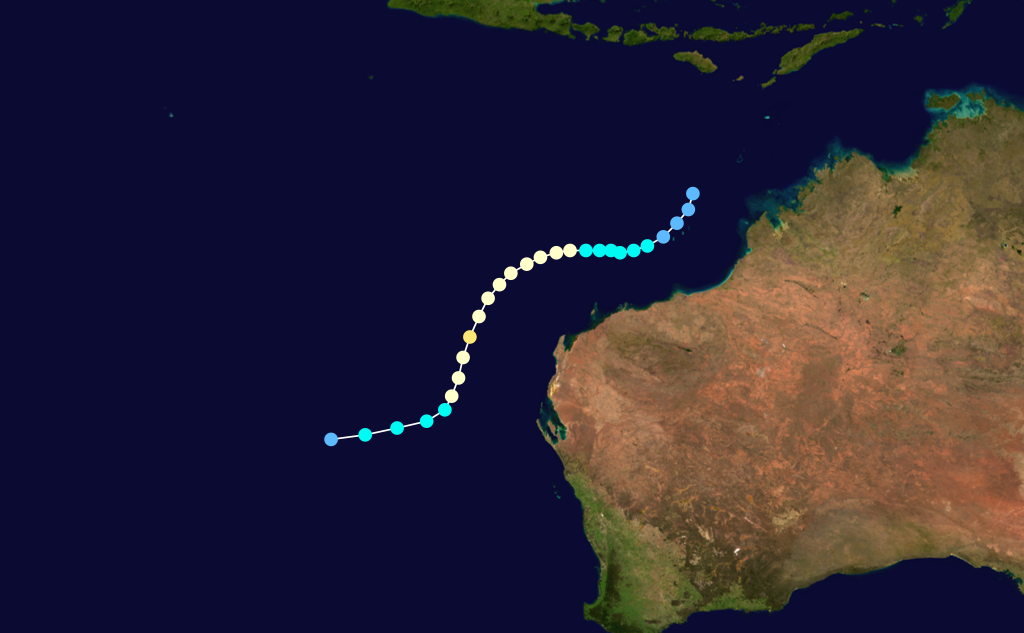
- Duration: 17 February – 23 February
- Peak intensity: 175 km/h (110 mph) (10-min); 950 hPa (mbar)

Bobby formed within the monsoon trough to the northwest of Broome, Western Australia, on 17 February. Bobby moved southwestward for much of its duration and dissipated by 23 February.

=== Severe Tropical Cyclone Ingrid ===
- Category 3 severe tropical cyclone (Australian scale)
- Category 1 tropical cyclone (SSHWS)
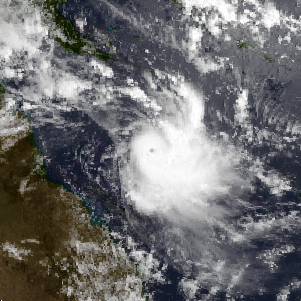
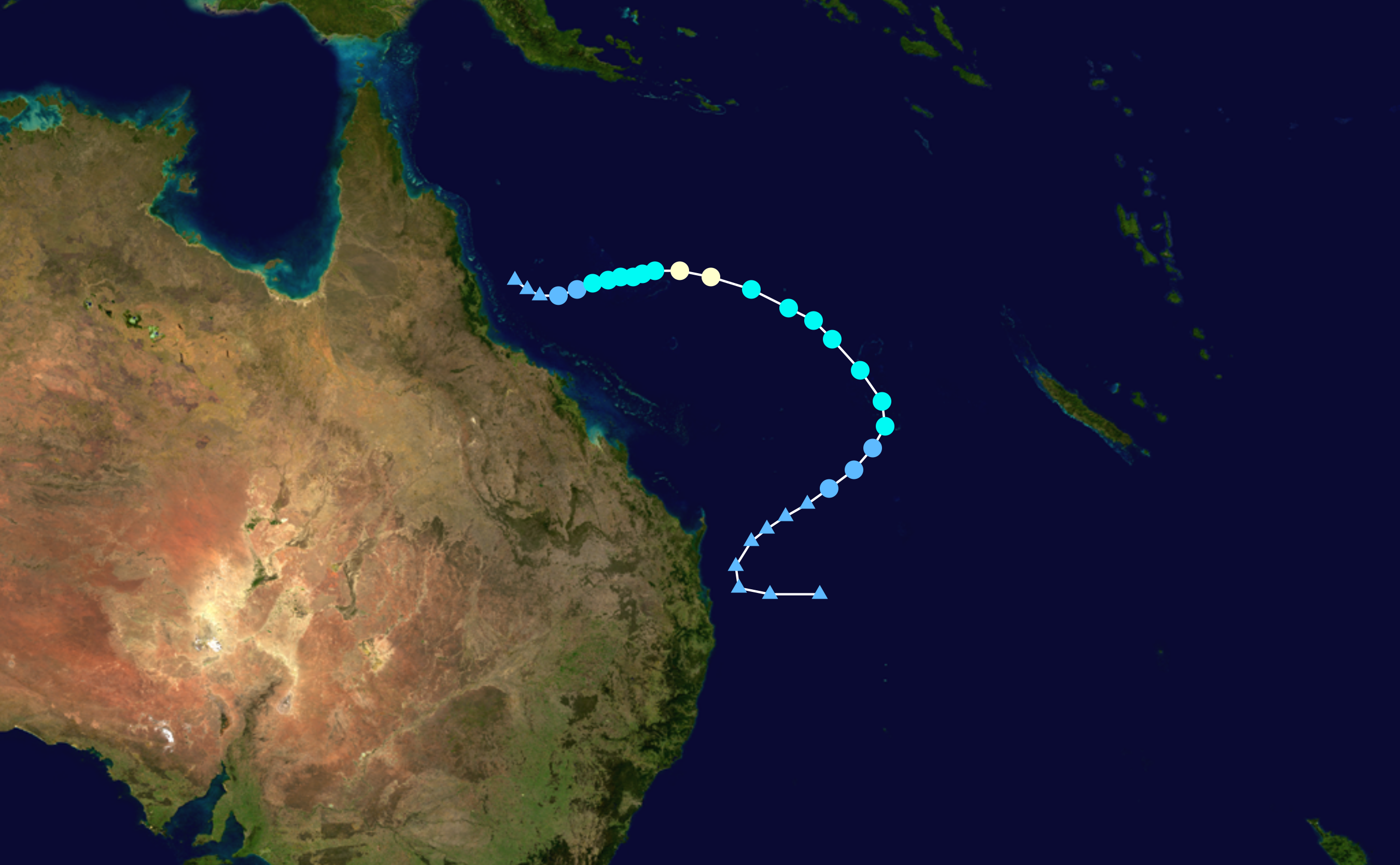
- Duration: 20 February – 25 February
- Peak intensity: 120 km/h (75 mph) (10-min); 975 hPa (mbar)

A tropical low developed into Cyclone Ingrid to the east of Innisfail, Queensland, on 20 February. Ingrid moved eastward and then east-southeastward by 23 February. The storm then curved southwestward and dissipated on 25 February. Ingrid brought strong winds and caused minor flooding in Cairns and Mackay.

=== Severe Tropical Cyclone Chloe ===
- Category 4 severe tropical cyclone (Australian scale)
- Category 2 tropical cyclone (SSHWS)
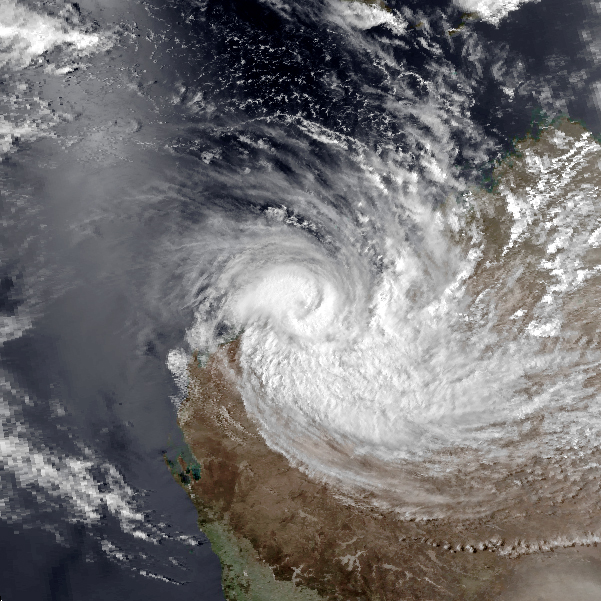
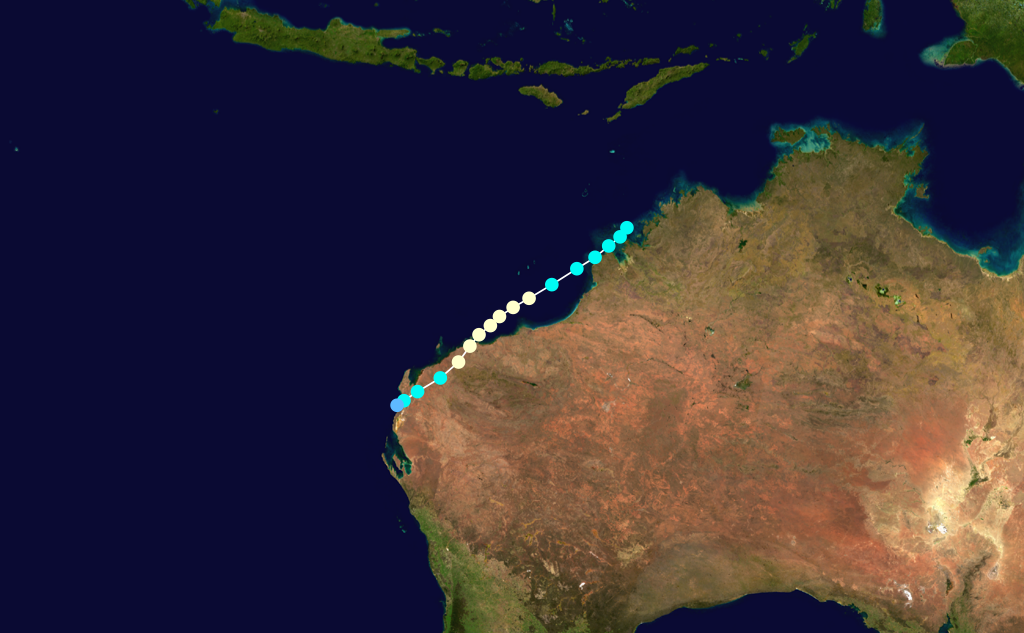
- Duration: 26 February – 3 March
- Peak intensity: 165 km/h (105 mph) (10-min); 955 hPa (mbar)

On 29 February 1984 Chloe crossed the coast near Roebourne, Western Australia where three houses were destroyed and twelve others unroofed. Fifty people required evacuation as floodwaters from the Harding River rose to the lower steps of the Police Station. Parts of the Wickham High Schools were severely damaged and two buildings and a boat were destroyed in the Cossack/Point Samson area. The Dampier Yacht Club was unroofed.

=== Tropical Cyclone Ferdinand ===
- Category 2 tropical cyclone (Australian scale)
- Tropical storm (SSHWS)
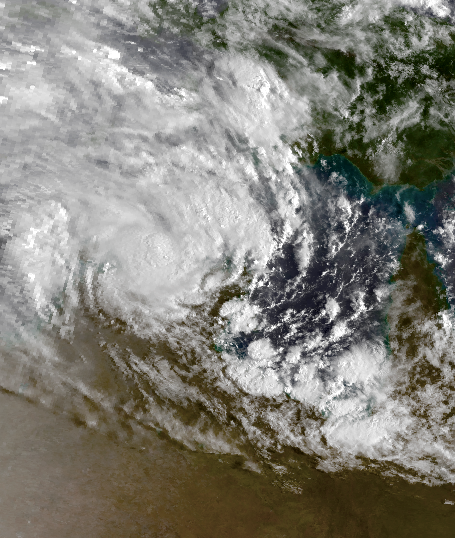
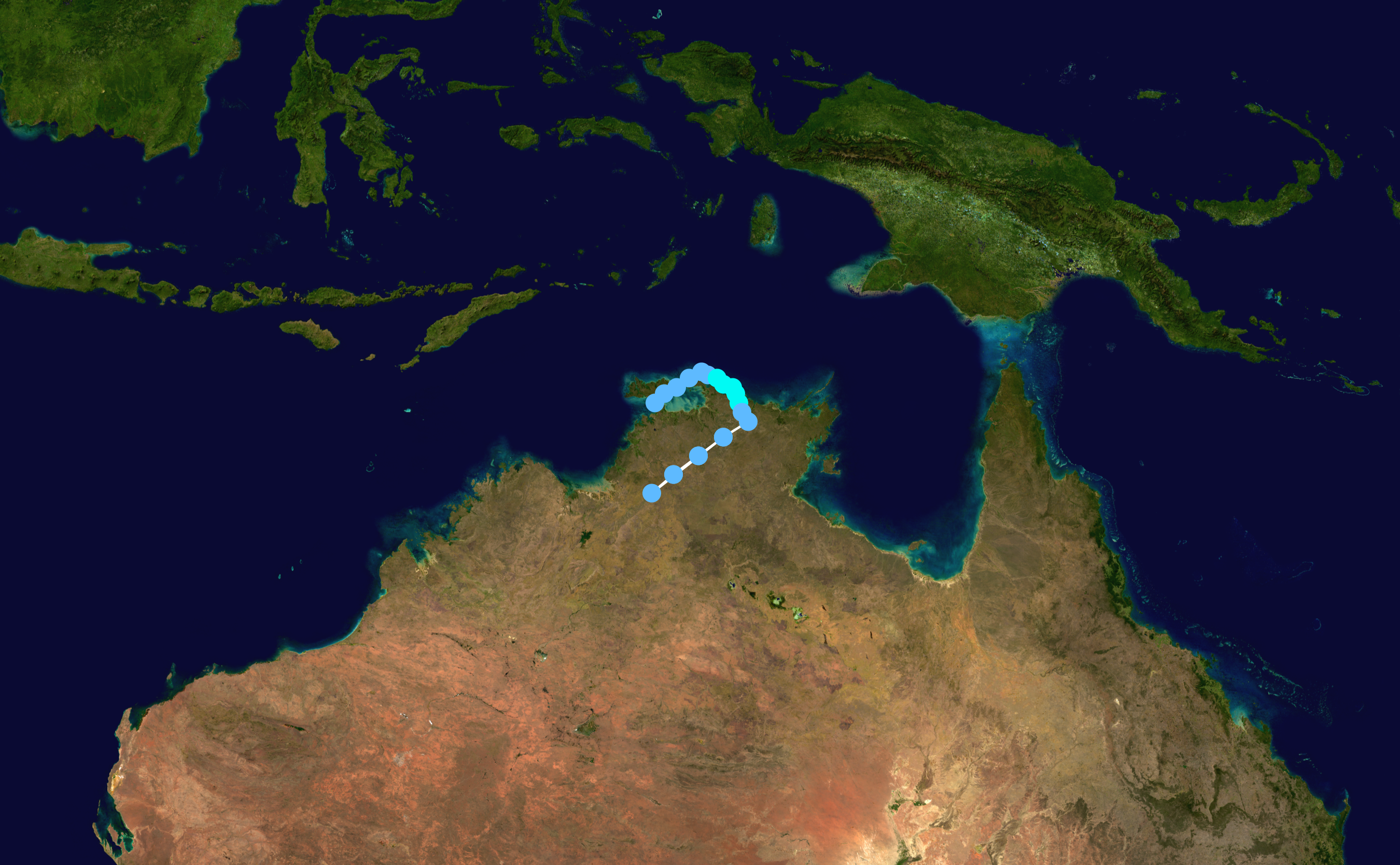
- Duration: 2 March – 5 March
- Peak intensity: 110 km/h (70 mph) (10-min); 983 hPa (mbar)

A weak tropical low intensified into Tropical Cyclone Ferdinand on 2 March. The cyclone moved eastward to east-southward and paralleled the northern coast of Northern Territory, until making landfall near Maningrida on 4 March. Ferdinand dissipated on the following day. Goulburn Island and the Miningrida area experienced minor damage.

=== Severe Tropical Cyclone Jim ===
- Category 3 severe tropical cyclone (Australian scale)
- Category 1 tropical cyclone (SSHWS)
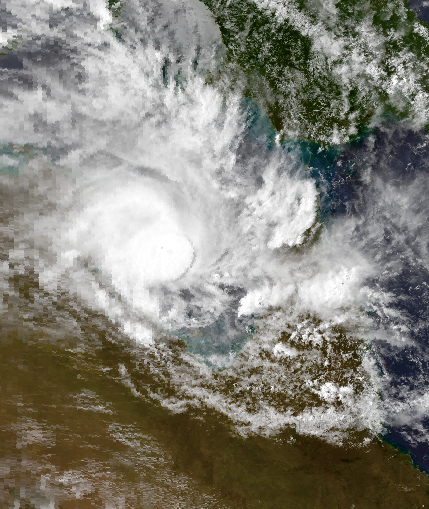
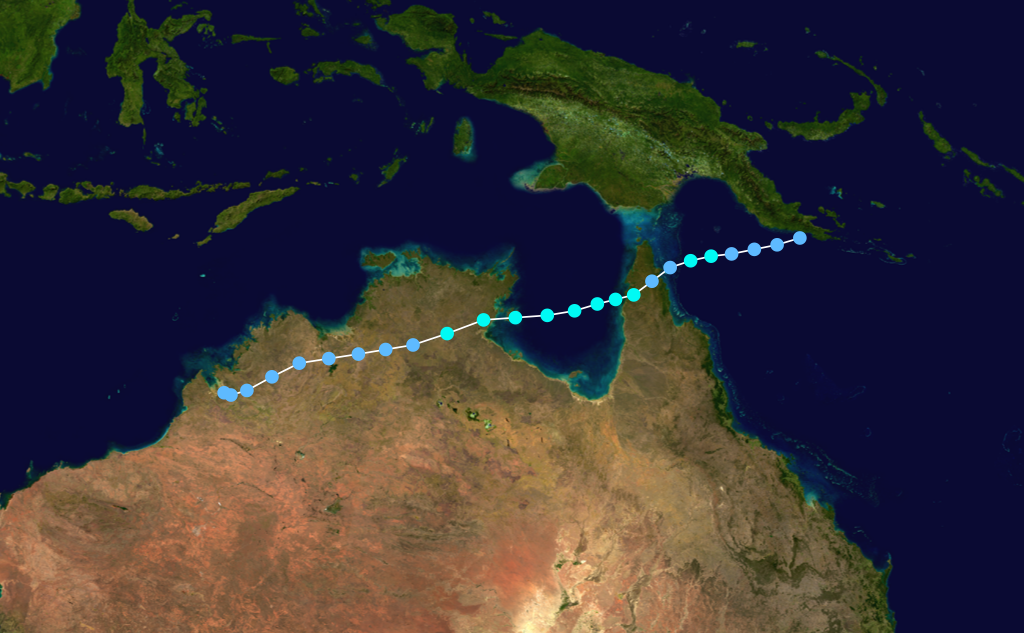
- Duration: 6 March – 10 March
- Peak intensity: 130 km/h (80 mph) (10-min); 970 hPa (mbar)

Cyclone Jim developed from a low just southeast of the mainland on Papua New Guinea on 6 March. The storm slowly deepened while heading generally west-southwestward. Early on 8 March, Jim struck Cape Grenville, Queensland. Jim left minor damage to vegetation and downed some large trees. After crossing the Cape York Peninsula, the system emerged into the Gulf of Carpentaria and later made landfall on 9 March at Port Roper, Northern Territory, which is just south of Numbulwar. Jim dissipated on the following day. A 15 m (49 ft) boat was beached at Alyangula. Inland, wind gusts as high as 100 km/h (60 mph) downed trees in the vicinity of the Roper River.

=== Severe Tropical Cyclone Daryl ===
- Category 4 severe tropical cyclone (Australian scale)
- Category 2 tropical cyclone (SSHWS)
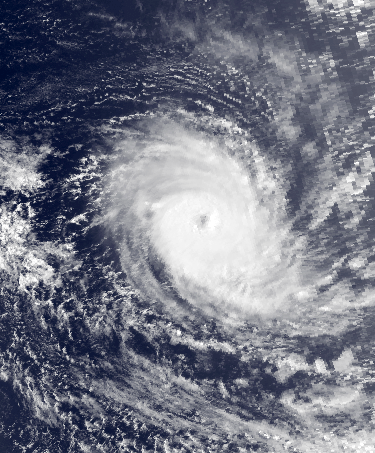
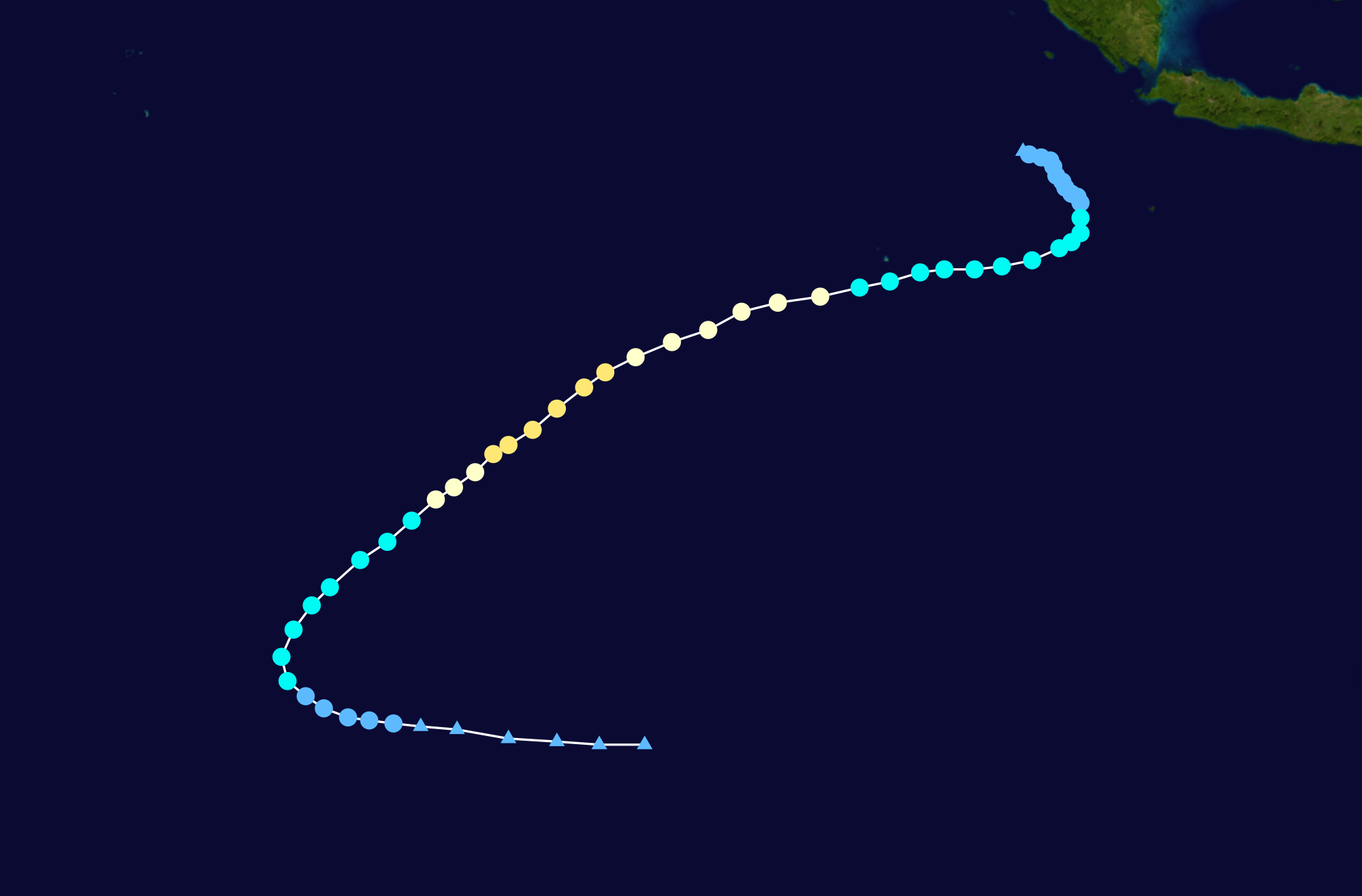
- Duration: 6 March – 20 March
- Peak intensity: 175 km/h (110 mph) (10-min); 955 hPa (mbar)

Daryl formed from a tropical low to the west-northwest of Christmas Island on 6 March. It trekked southwestward and entered the southwest Indian Ocean basin on 16 March, but was not renamed. On 18 March, Daryl entered the Australian region basin, but dissipated by 20 March.

=== Severe Tropical Cyclone Kathy ===
- Category 5 severe tropical cyclone (Australian scale)
- Category 4 tropical cyclone (SSHWS)
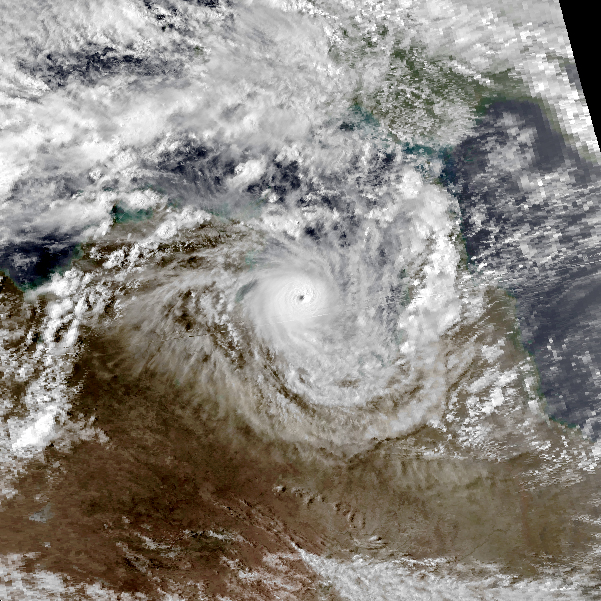
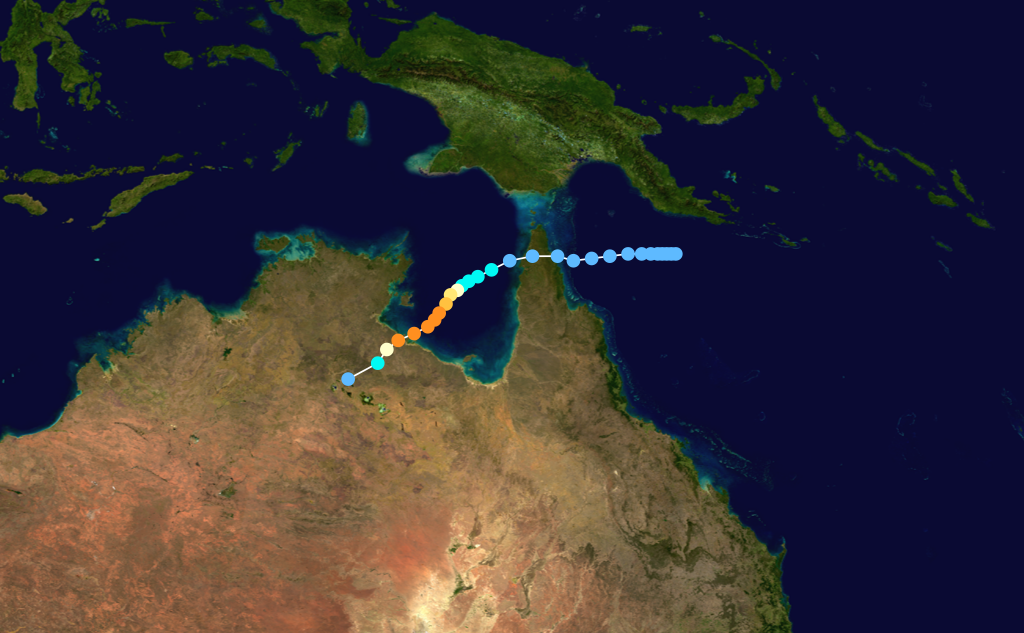
- Duration: March 16 – March 23
- Peak intensity: 205 km/h (125 mph) (10-min); 916 hPa (mbar)

Severe Tropical Cyclone Kathy was a powerful tropical cyclone that devastated the Sir Edward Pellew Group of Islands in March 1984. Originating from a tropical low off the southern coast of Papua New Guinea. Tracking westward, the system attained gale-force winds by 18 March before striking the Cape York Peninsula. After crossing the area, Kathy entered the Gulf of Carpentaria where environmental conditions favored significant development. On 22 March, the storm attained its peak intensity as a Category 5 severe tropical cyclone (Australian tropical cyclone intensity scale) with ten-minute sustained winds of 205 km/h (125 mph). By this time, the storm had been tracking towards the southwest and struck the Sir Edward Pellew Group of Islands later on 22 March before moving over the Australian mainland as a slightly weaker system. Once over land, Kathy rapidly degraded, losing gale-force winds within 24 hours; the storm dissipated over the Northern Territory on 24 March.

One person died and damaged totaled to 12 million.

=== Tropical Cyclone Lance ===
- Category 2 tropical cyclone (Australian scale)
- Tropical storm (SSHWS)
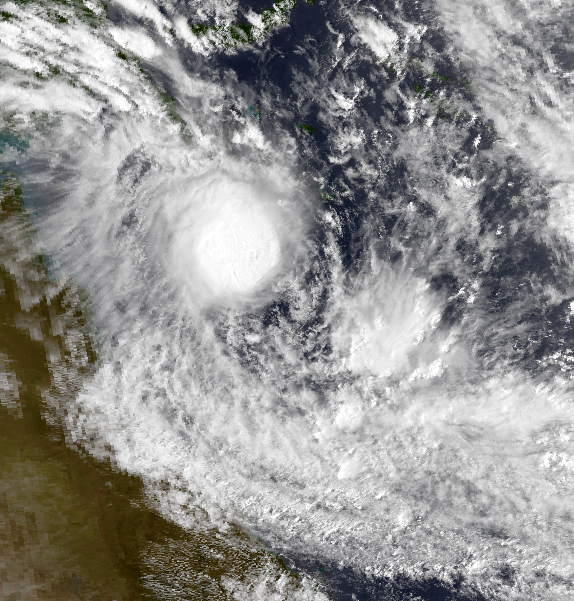
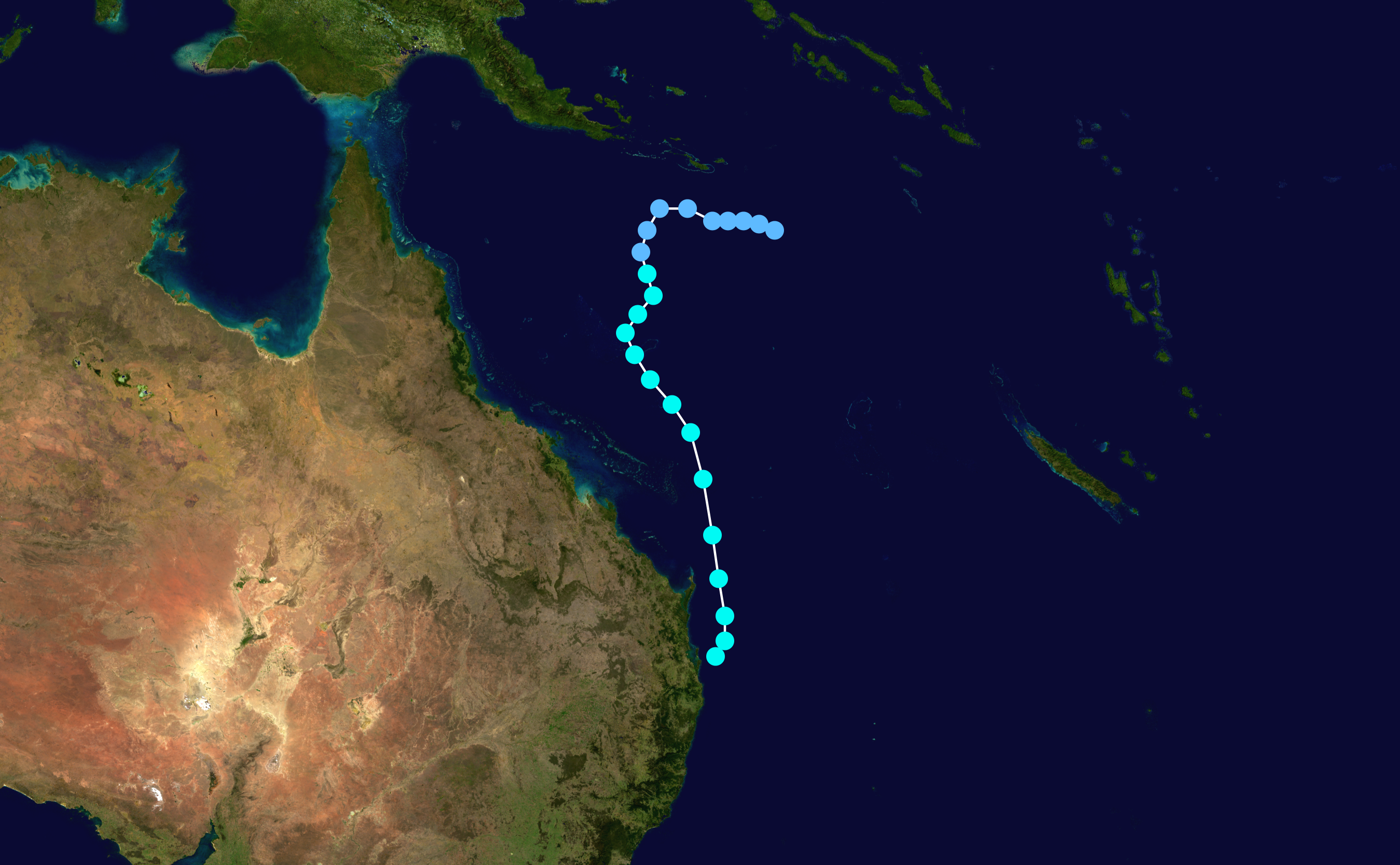
- Duration: 4 April – 7 April
- Peak intensity: 95 km/h (60 mph) (10-min); 992 hPa (mbar)

Lance affected Queensland before dissipating on April 17.

=== Other systems ===
During 30 January a shallow tropical low developed over the south-eastern Coral Sea. Over the next couple of days the system gradually developed further as it moved westwards into the South Pacific basin. The system was subsequently named Beti during 2 February, before it impacted the Loyalty Islands and lost its tropical characteristics during 6 February.

== See also ==
- Atlantic hurricane seasons: 1983, 1984
- Eastern Pacific hurricane seasons: 1983, 1984
- Western Pacific typhoon seasons: 1983, 1984
- North Indian Ocean cyclone seasons: 1983, 1984
