= 1983 hurricane season =

1983 hurricane season may refer to:

- The 1983 Atlantic hurricane season
- The 1983 Pacific hurricane season
