= 1982–83 Australian region cyclone season =

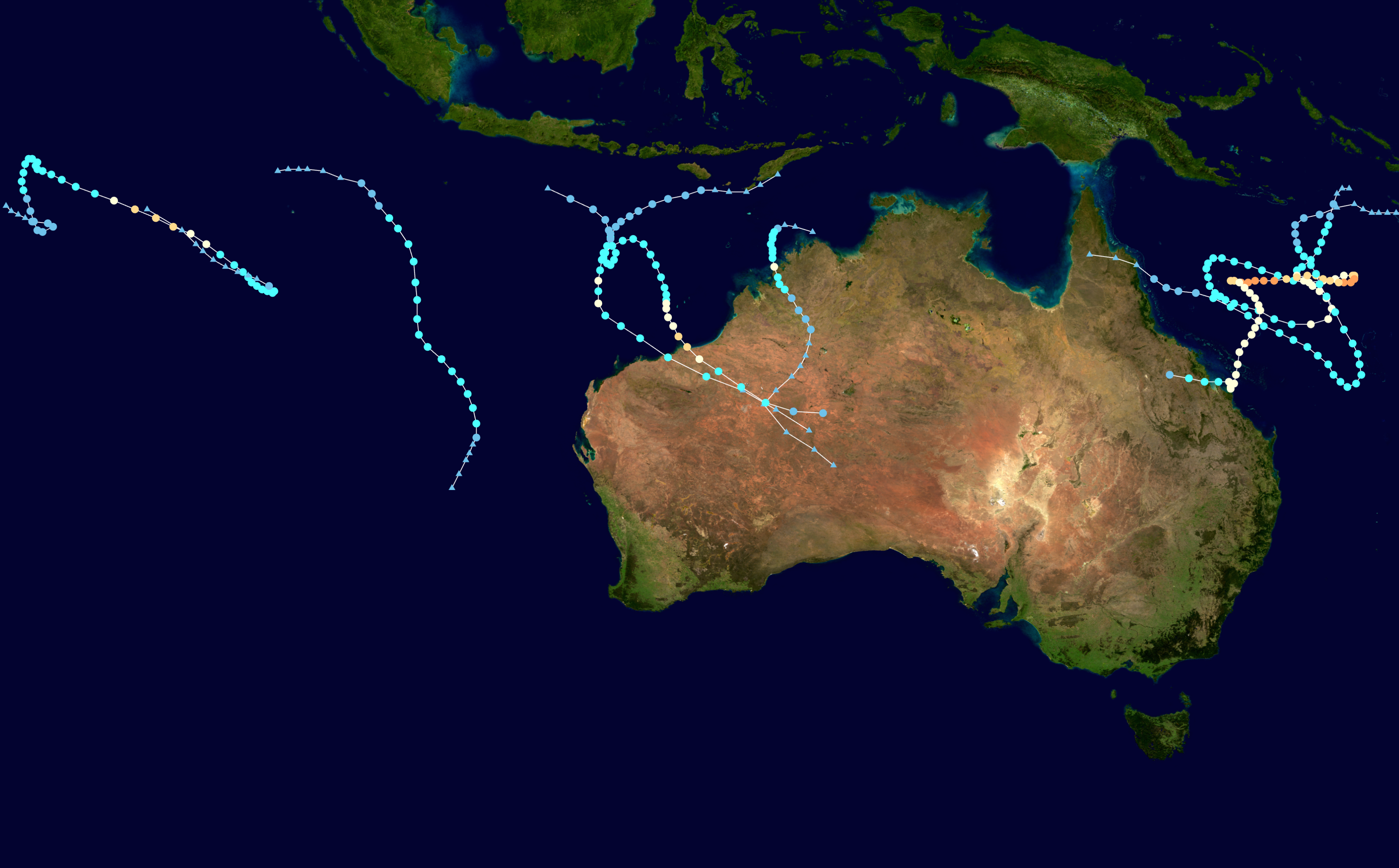
- Season summary map

Seasonal boundaries
- First system formed: 2 January 1983
- Last system dissipated: 2 May 1983

Strongest storm
- Name: Elinor
  - Maximum winds: 205 km/h (125 mph) (10-minute sustained)
  - Lowest pressure: 935 hPa (mbar)

Seasonal statistics
- Tropical lows: 7
- Tropical cyclones: 7
- Severe tropical cyclones: 6
- Total fatalities: Unknown
- Total damage: Unknown

Related articles
- 1982–83 South-West Indian Ocean cyclone season; 1982–83 South Pacific cyclone season

The 1982–83 Australian region cyclone season was the third-latest starting season on record, only behind 1986-87 and 2019-20. It was a below average tropical cyclone season, though almost all of the storms became severe tropical cyclones. It officially started on 1 November 1982, and officially ended on 30 April 1983.

== Systems ==
=== Severe Tropical Cyclone Jane ===
- Category 4 severe tropical cyclone (Australian scale)
- Category 2 tropical cyclone (SSHWS)
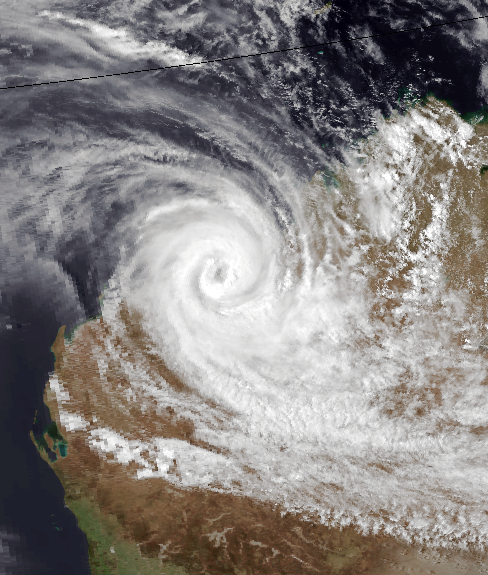
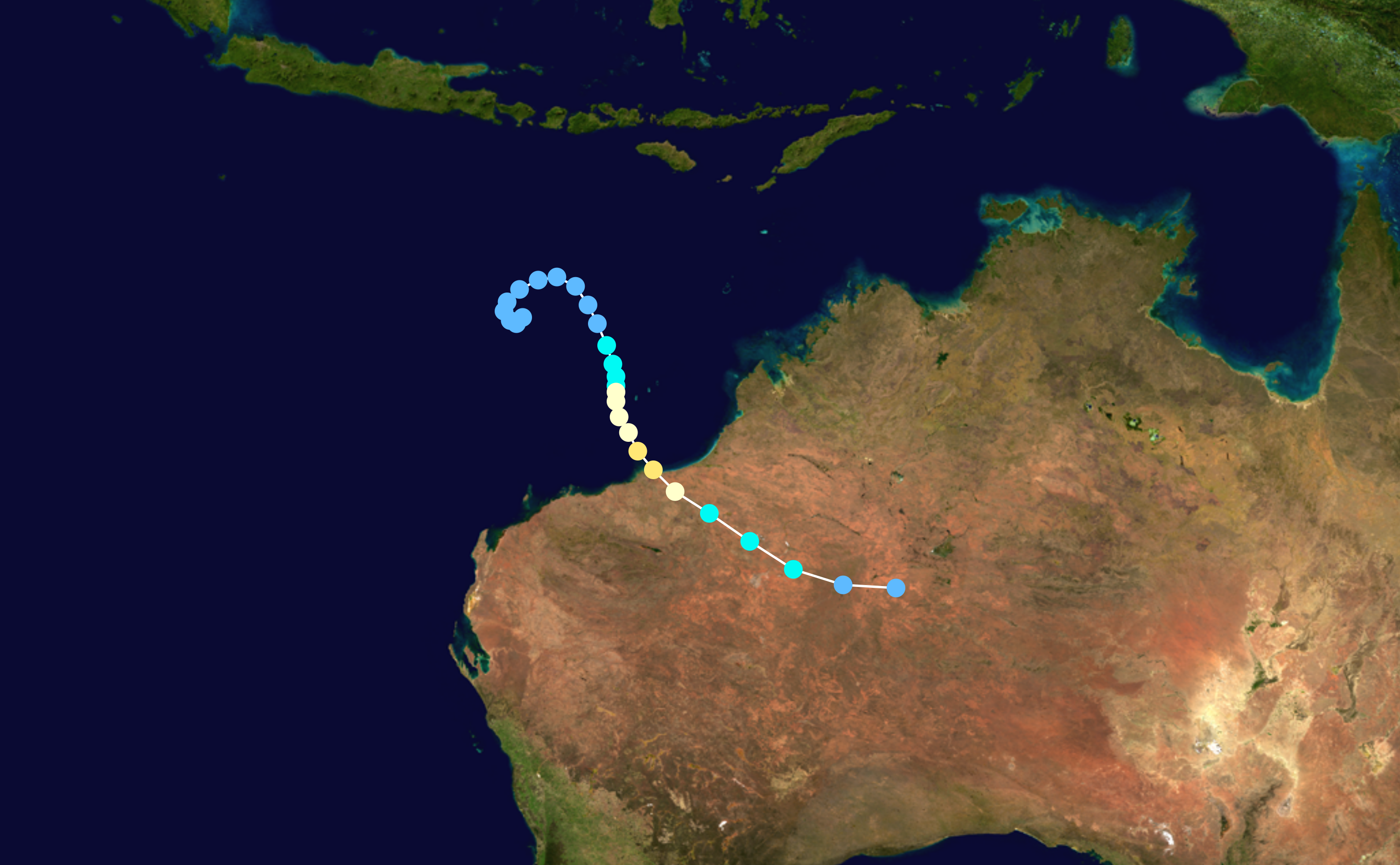
- Duration: 2 January – 10 January
- Peak intensity: 165 km/h (105 mph) (10-min); 947 hPa (mbar)

Jane formed on January 2, 1983, near Indonesia. The storm moved southward where it reached Category 1 status on the same day. Jane did a small loop before continuing south-eastward. Jane reached Category 4 status before making landfall east of Port Hedland, Western Australia. Jane then dissipated after January 10.

=== Tropical Cyclone Des ===
- Category 1 tropical cyclone (Australian scale)
- Tropical storm (SSHWS)
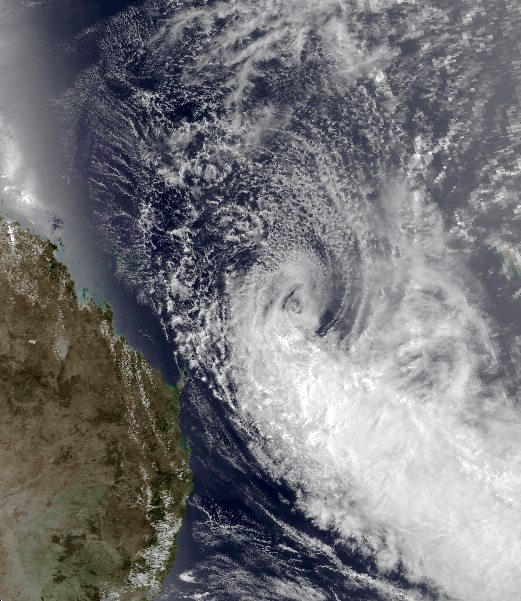
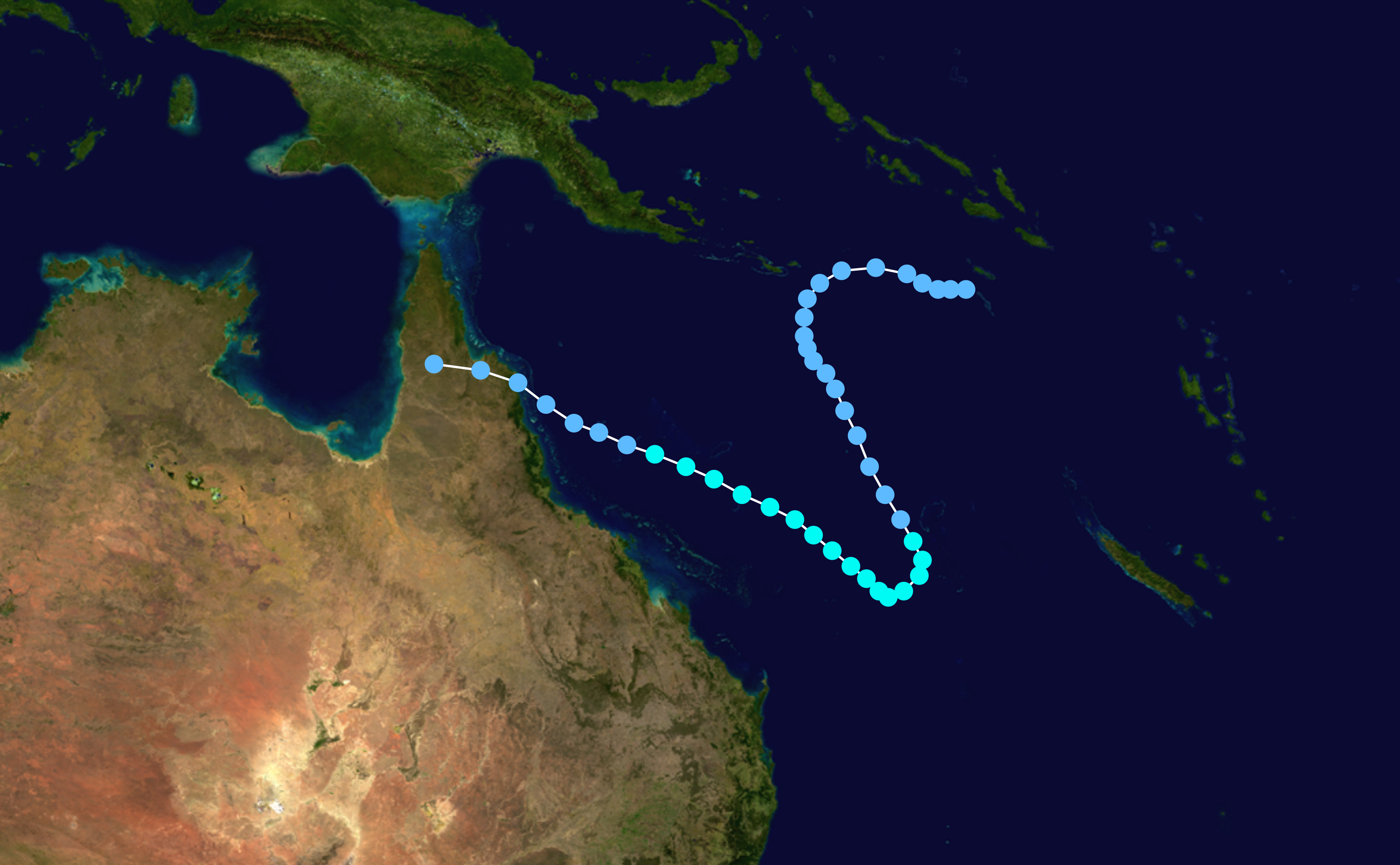
- Duration: 14 January – 23 January
- Peak intensity: 65 km/h (40 mph) (10-min); 994 hPa (mbar)

A tropical depression developed within a monsoon trough east-northeast of Cairns, Queensland, on 14 January. Des moved east-southeastward and strengthened gradually. Later, the storm tracked generally northward, until curving eastward and dissipating on 23 January.

=== Severe Tropical Cyclone Elinor ===
- Category 5 severe tropical cyclone (Australian scale)
- Category 3 tropical cyclone (SSHWS)
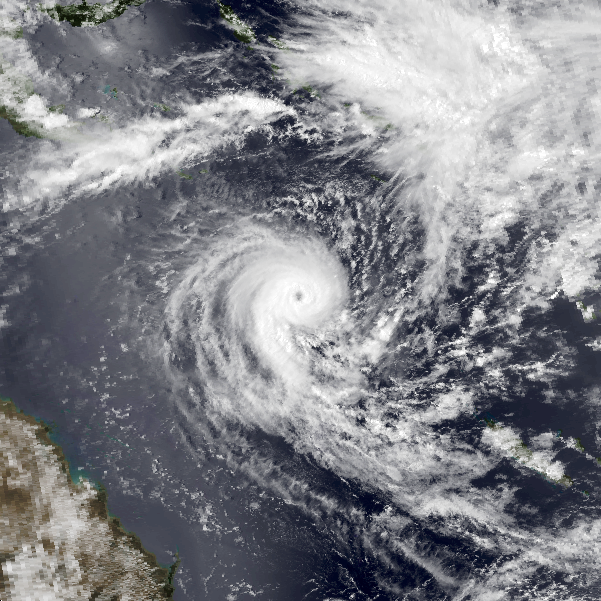
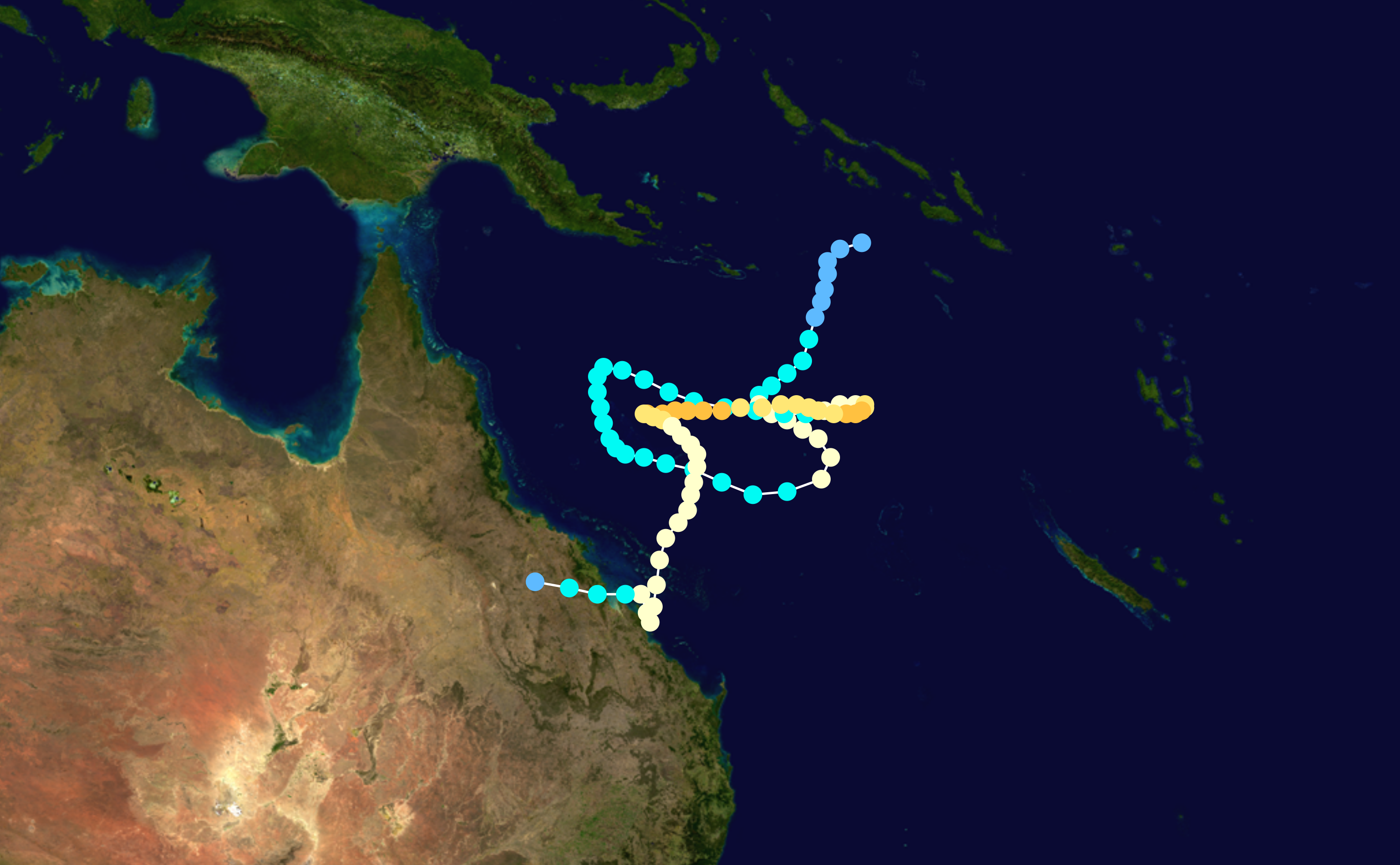
- Duration: 10 February – 4 March
- Peak intensity: 205 km/h (125 mph) (10-min); 935 hPa (mbar)

In March 1983, Cyclone Elinor made landfall in Queensland, wrecking two yachts.

=== Severe Tropical Cyclone Ken ===
- Category 3 severe tropical cyclone (Australian scale)
- Tropical storm (SSHWS)
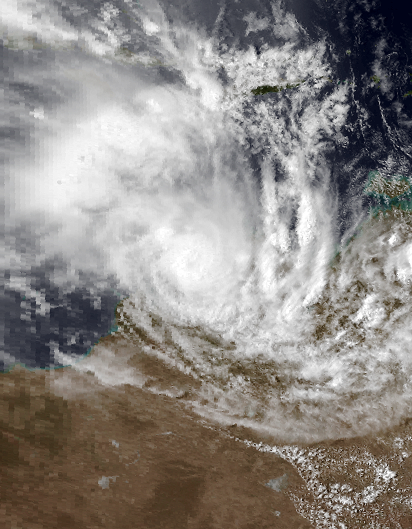
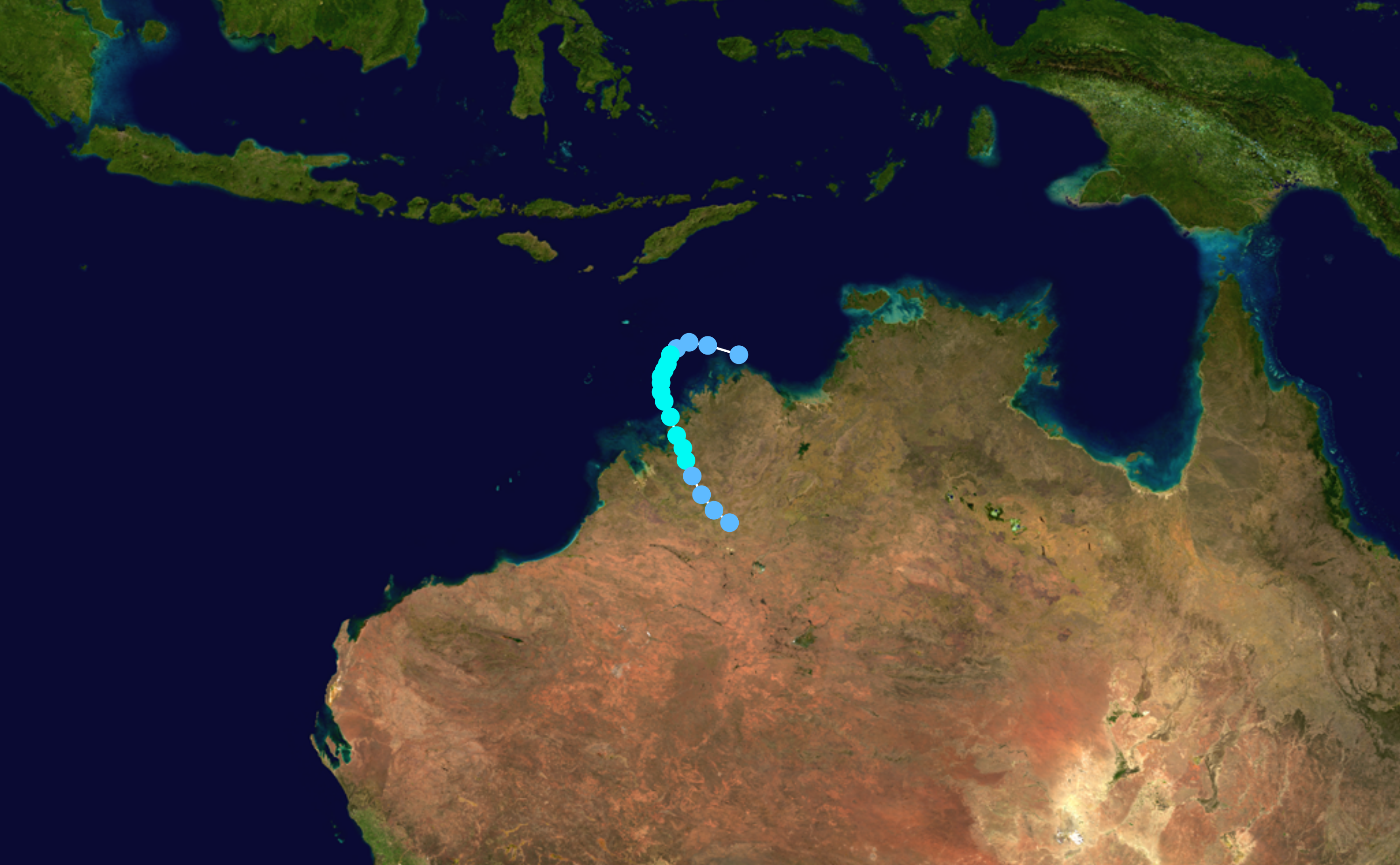
- Duration: 28 February – 6 March
- Peak intensity: 120 km/h (75 mph) (10-min); 970 hPa (mbar)

Ken formed on February 28, 1983, several hundred miles north of Australia. The storm briefly reached Category 3 status before making landfall in the sparsely populated area. The storm dissipated well inland by March 6.

=== Severe Tropical Cyclone Lena ===
- Category 3 severe tropical cyclone (Australian scale)
- Category 1 tropical cyclone (SSHWS)
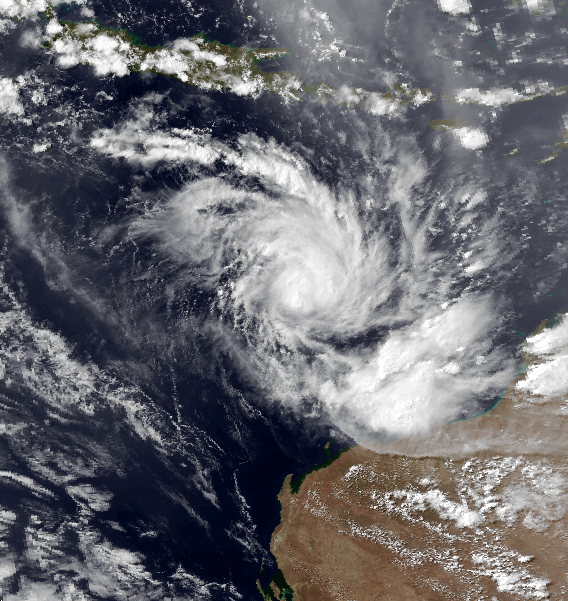
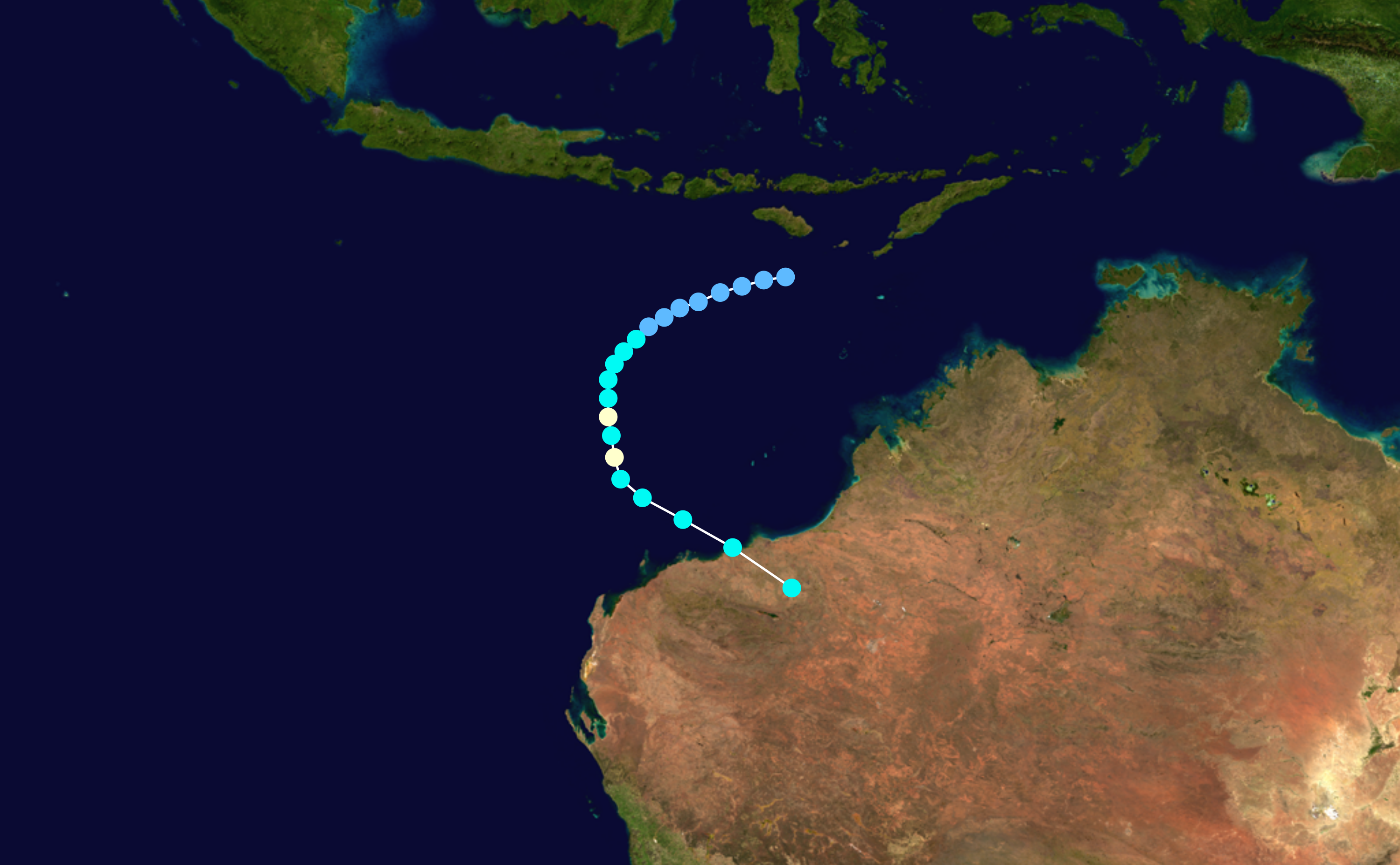
- Duration: 2 April – 9 April
- Peak intensity: 120 km/h (75 mph) (10-min); 980 hPa (mbar)

Lena formed off the coast of Indonesia on April 3, 1983. The storm reached Category 2 status before making landfall at Port Hedland, Australia. The storm dissipated on April 9.

=== Severe Tropical Cyclone Naomi ===
- Category 3 severe tropical cyclone (Australian scale)
- Category 2 tropical cyclone (SSHWS)
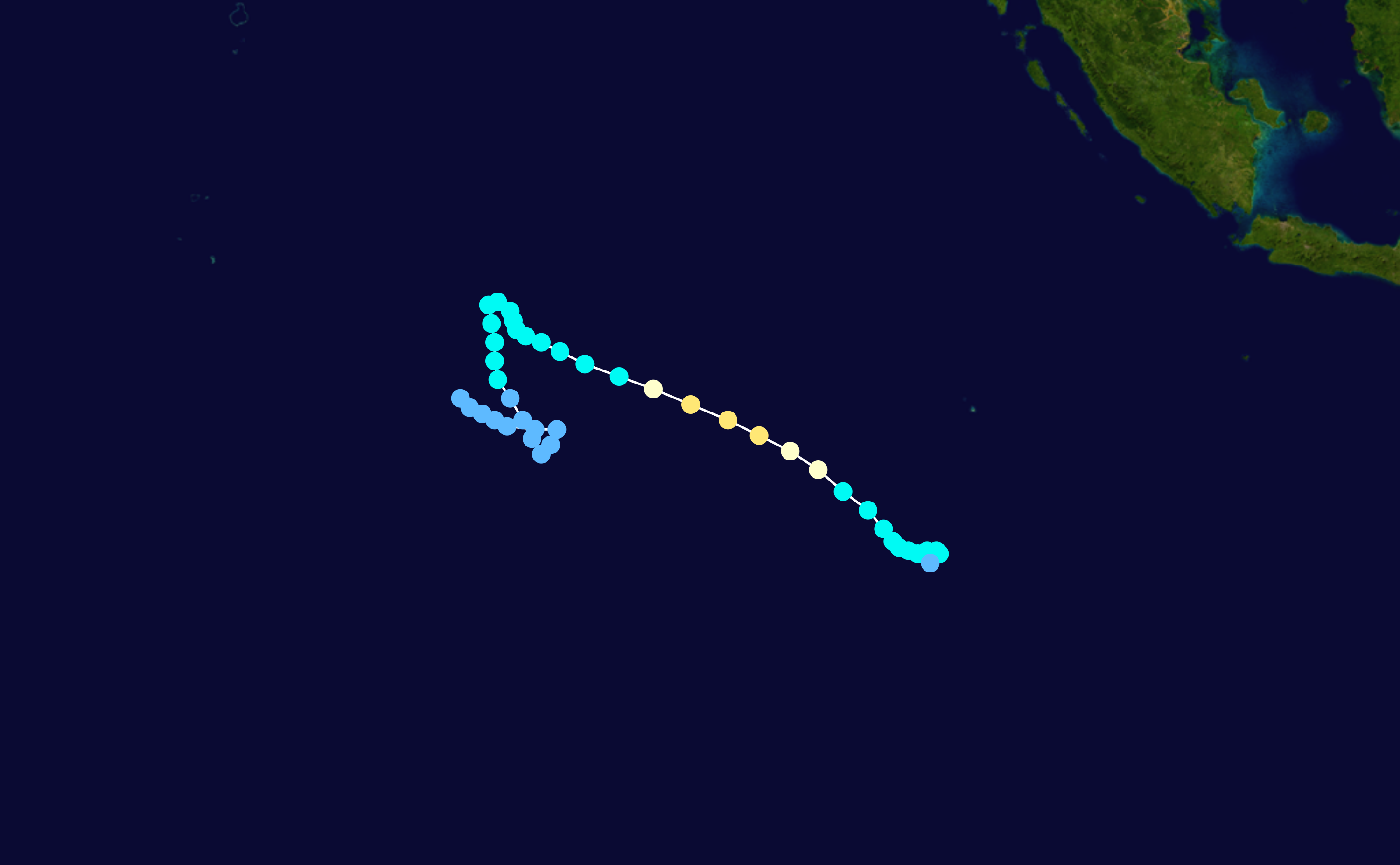
- Duration: 21 April – 2 May
- Peak intensity: 150 km/h (90 mph) (10-min); 960 hPa (mbar)

A tropical low developed near the western edge of the Australia region basin on 21 April. After strengthening into Cyclone Naomi, the system headed southeastward for much of its duration. By 30 April, Naomi doubled-back and moved northwestward, but dissipated on 2 May.

=== Severe Tropical Cyclone Monty ===
- Category 3 severe tropical cyclone (Australian scale)
- Tropical storm (SSHWS)
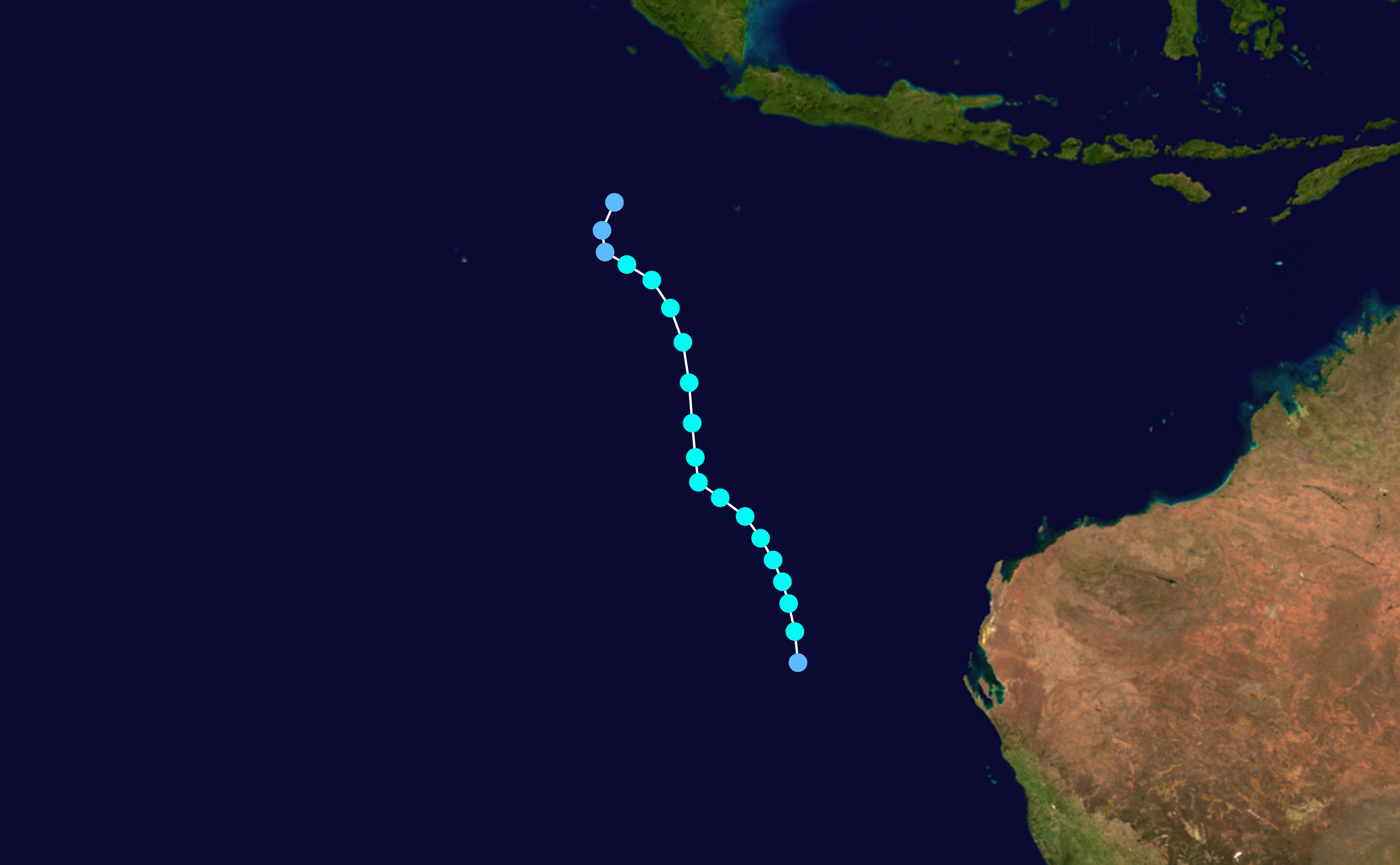
- Duration: 22 April – 29 April
- Peak intensity: 120 km/h (75 mph) (10-min); 975 hPa (mbar)

The final cyclone of the season, Monty, developed from a weak tropical low on 22 April. Moving generally southward, Monty dissipated on 29 April.

== See also ==
- Atlantic hurricane seasons: 1982, 1983,
- Eastern Pacific hurricane seasons: 1982, 1983
- Western Pacific typhoon seasons: 1982, 1983
- North Indian Ocean cyclone seasons: 1982, 1983
