= 1983 North Indian Ocean cyclone season =

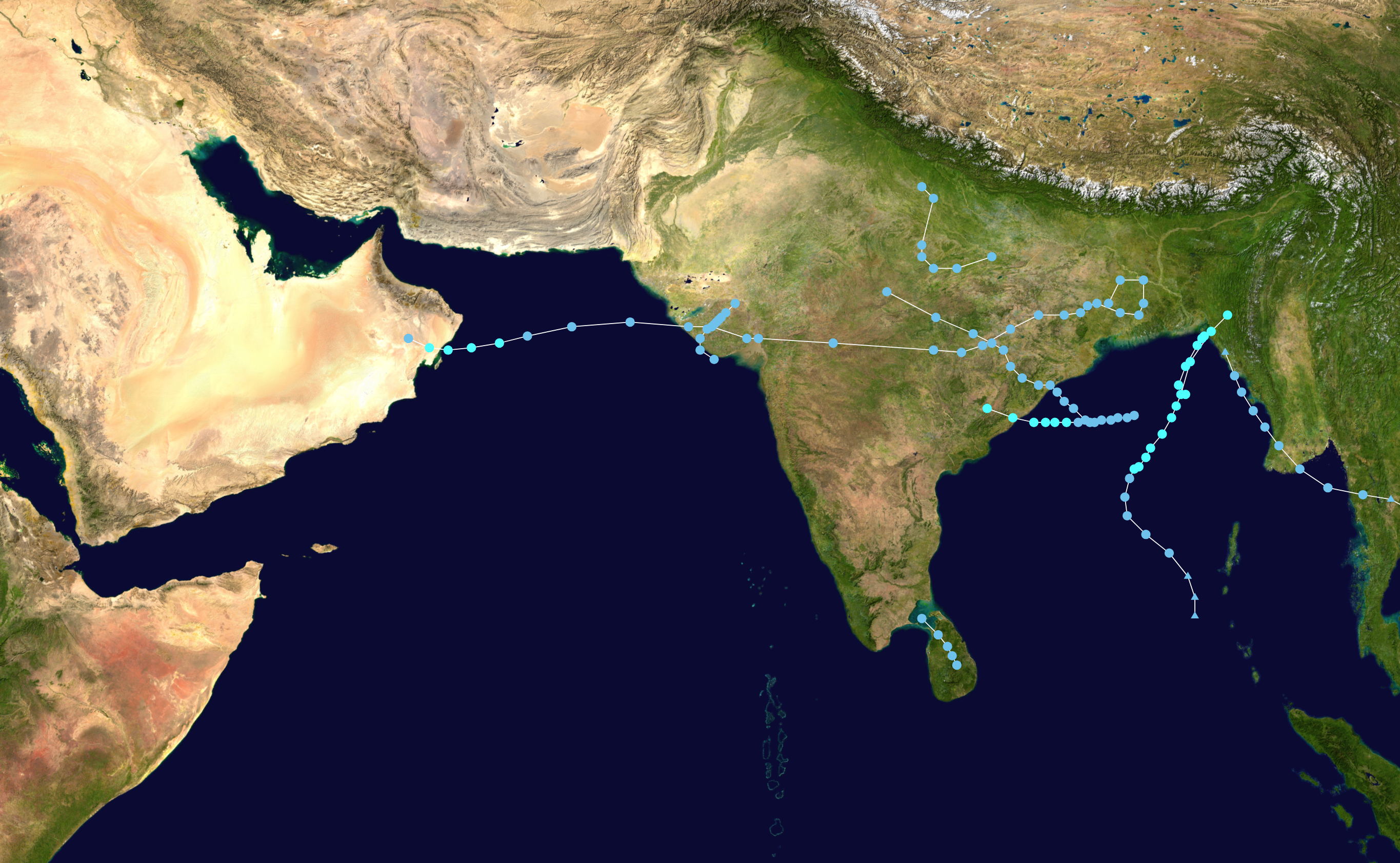
- Season summary map

Seasonal boundaries
- First system formed: June 20, 1983
- Last system dissipated: December 22, 1983

Strongest storm
- Name: BOB 03
  - Maximum winds: 165 km/h (105 mph) (3-minute sustained)
  - Lowest pressure: 980 hPa (mbar)

Seasonal statistics
- Depressions: 7, 2 unofficial
- Deep depressions: 5, 2 unofficial
- Cyclonic storms: 2, 1 unofficial
- Severe cyclonic storms: 1
- Very severe cyclonic storms: 1
- Extremely severe cyclonic storms: 1
- Total fatalities: Unknown
- Total damage: Unknown

Related articles
- 1983 Atlantic hurricane season; 1983 Pacific hurricane season; 1983 Pacific typhoon season

The 1983 North Indian Ocean cyclone season was the least active in 27 years. It was a below average season. A season has no official bounds but cyclones tend to form between April and December. These dates conventionally delimit the period of each year when most tropical cyclones form in the northern Indian Ocean. There are two main seas in the North Indian Ocean—the Bay of Bengal to the east of the Indian subcontinent and the Arabian Sea to the west of India. The official Regional Specialized Meteorological Centre in this basin is the India Meteorological Department (IMD), while the Joint Typhoon Warning Center (JTWC) releases unofficial advisories. An average of five tropical cyclones form in the North Indian Ocean every season with peaks in May and November. Cyclones occurring between the meridians 45°E and 100°E are included in the season by the IMD.

== Systems ==
=== Depression ARB 01 ===
- Depression (IMD)
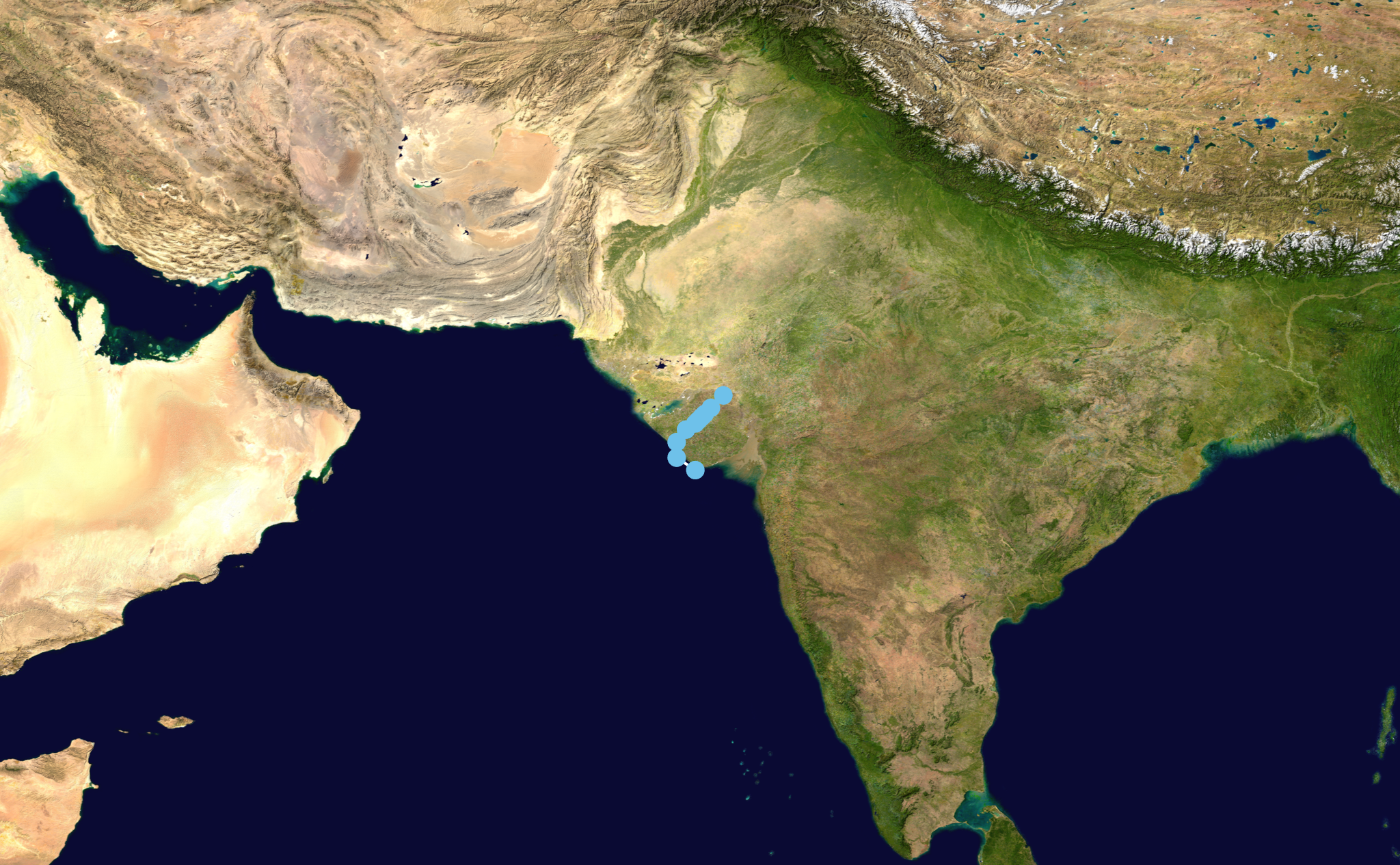
- Duration: June 20 – June 22
- Peak intensity: 45 km/h (30 mph) (3-min);

A tropical depression formed just offshore of Gujarat on June 20. It moved inland shortly after and fully dissipated on June 22.

=== Deep Depression BOB 01 ===
- Deep depression (IMD)
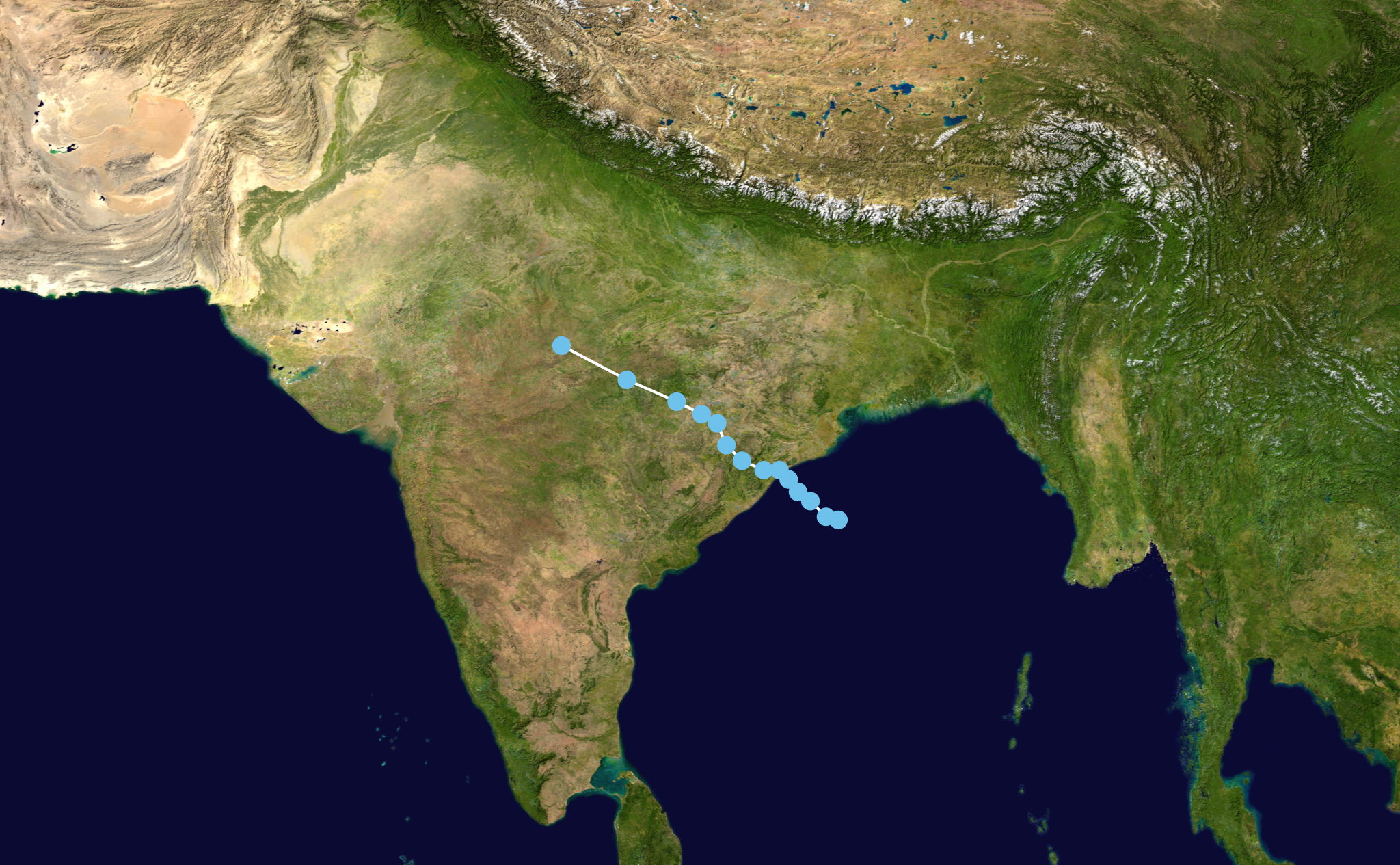
- Duration: June 24 – June 27
- Peak intensity: 55 km/h (35 mph) (3-min);

Shortly after the previous storm dissipated, a new depression formed in the Bay of Bengal on June 24. It moved inland the next day.

=== Deep Depression LAND 01 (Aurora) ===
- Deep depression (IMD)
- Tropical storm (SSHWS)
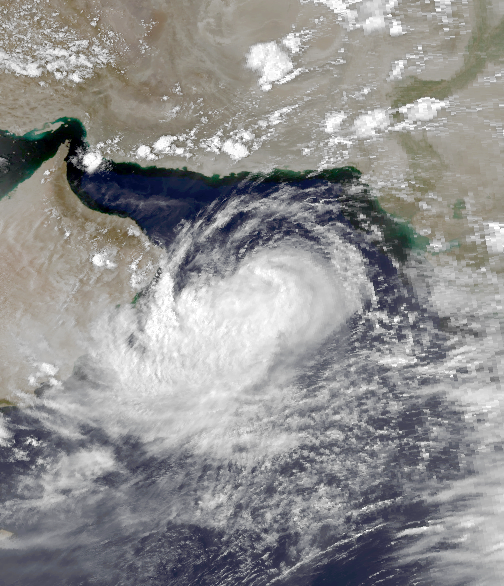
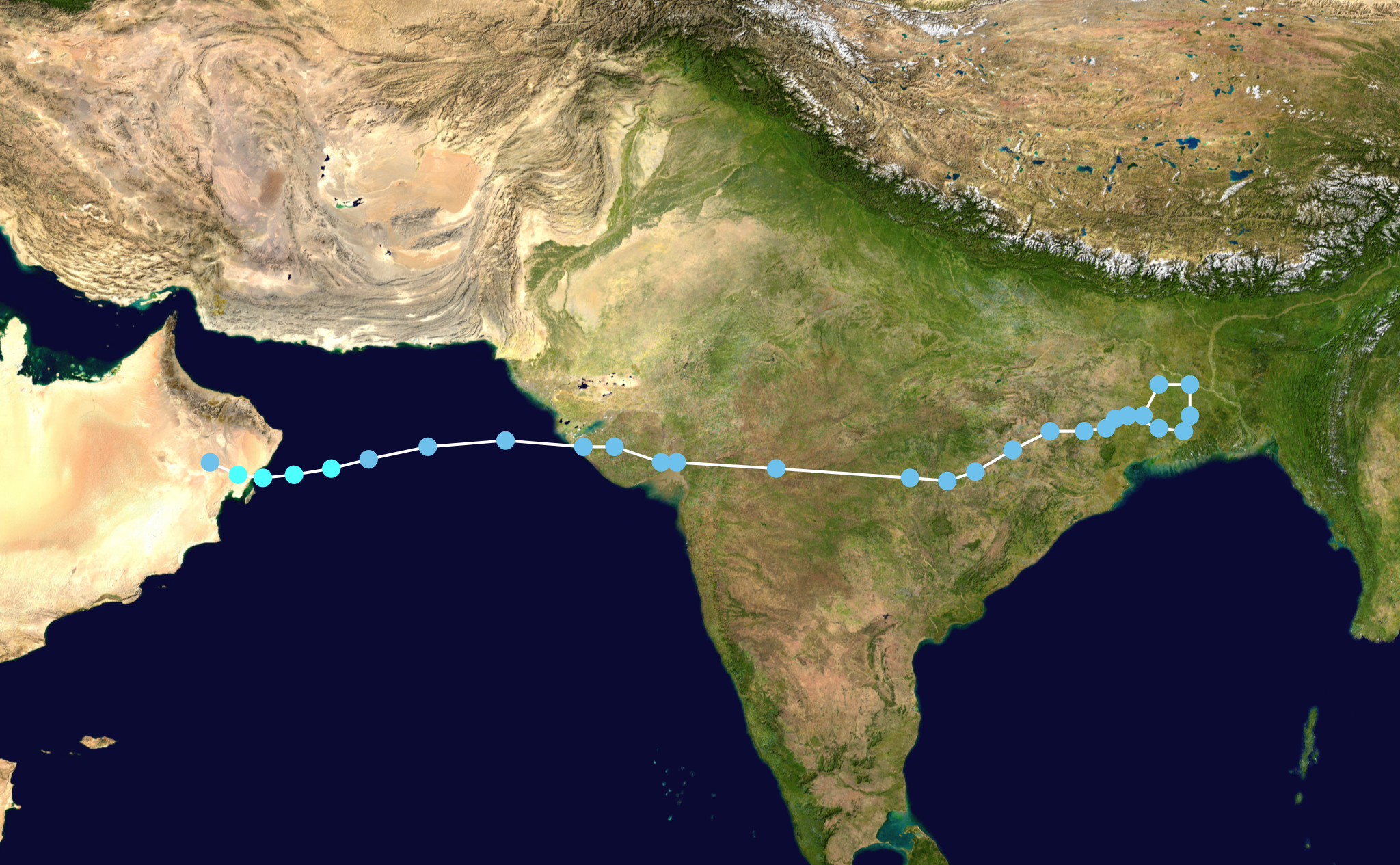
- Duration: August 4 – August 10
- Peak intensity: 55 km/h (35 mph) (3-min); 985 hPa (mbar)

On August 9 a tropical depression developed in the northwest Arabian Sea. It tracked westward, becoming a tropical storm later that day. Aurora reached a peak of 50 mph winds before hitting eastern Oman on the 10th, where it dissipated shortly thereafter. The system was unofficially named as Aurora by the JTWC.

On Masirah Island, the storm dropped 46 mm (1.8 in) of rainfall.

=== Depression LAND 02 ===
- Depression (IMD)
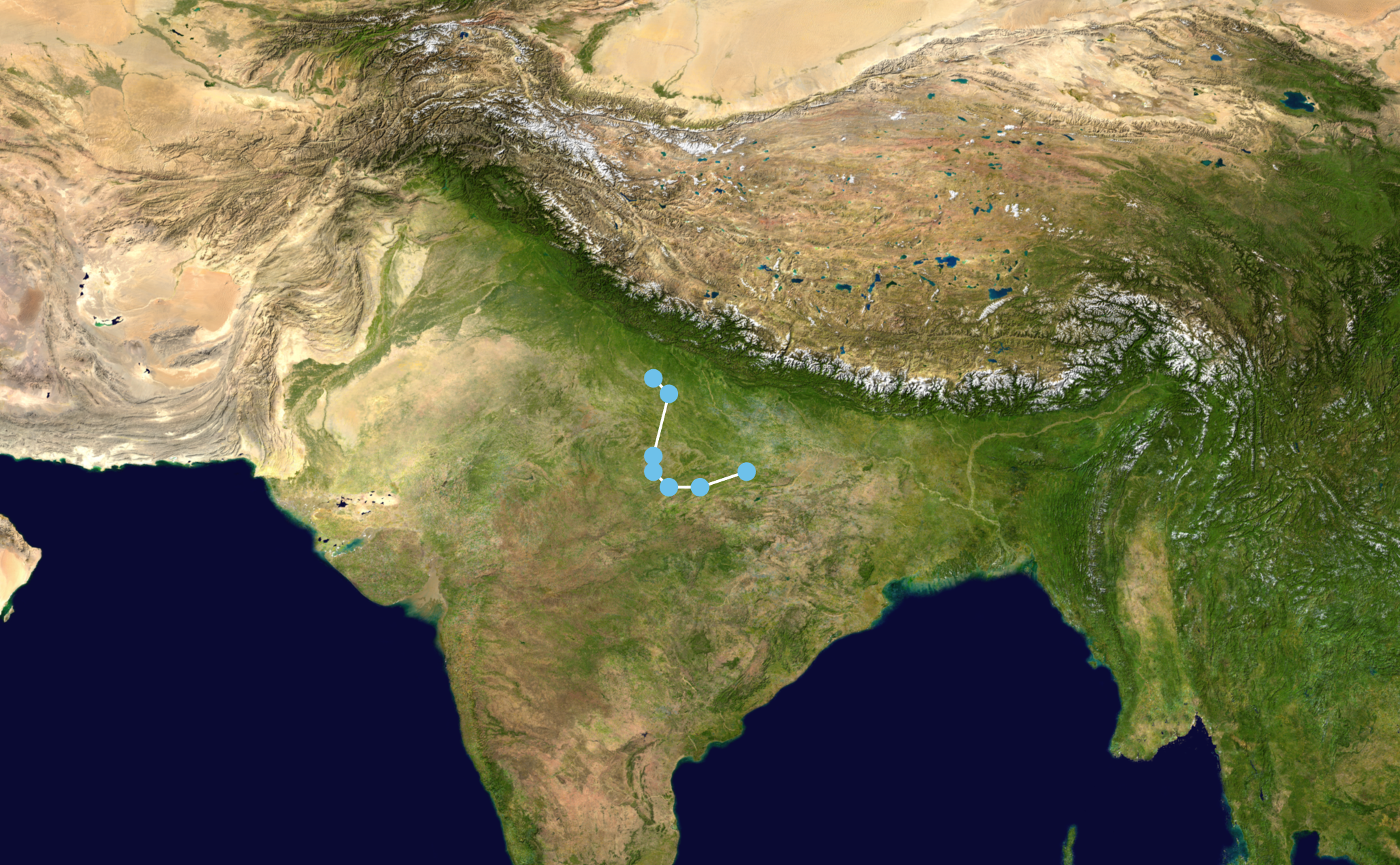
- Duration: September 9 – September 10
- Peak intensity: 45 km/h (30 mph) (3-min);

=== Severe Cyclonic Storm BOB 02 (Herbert) ===
- Severe cyclonic storm (IMD)
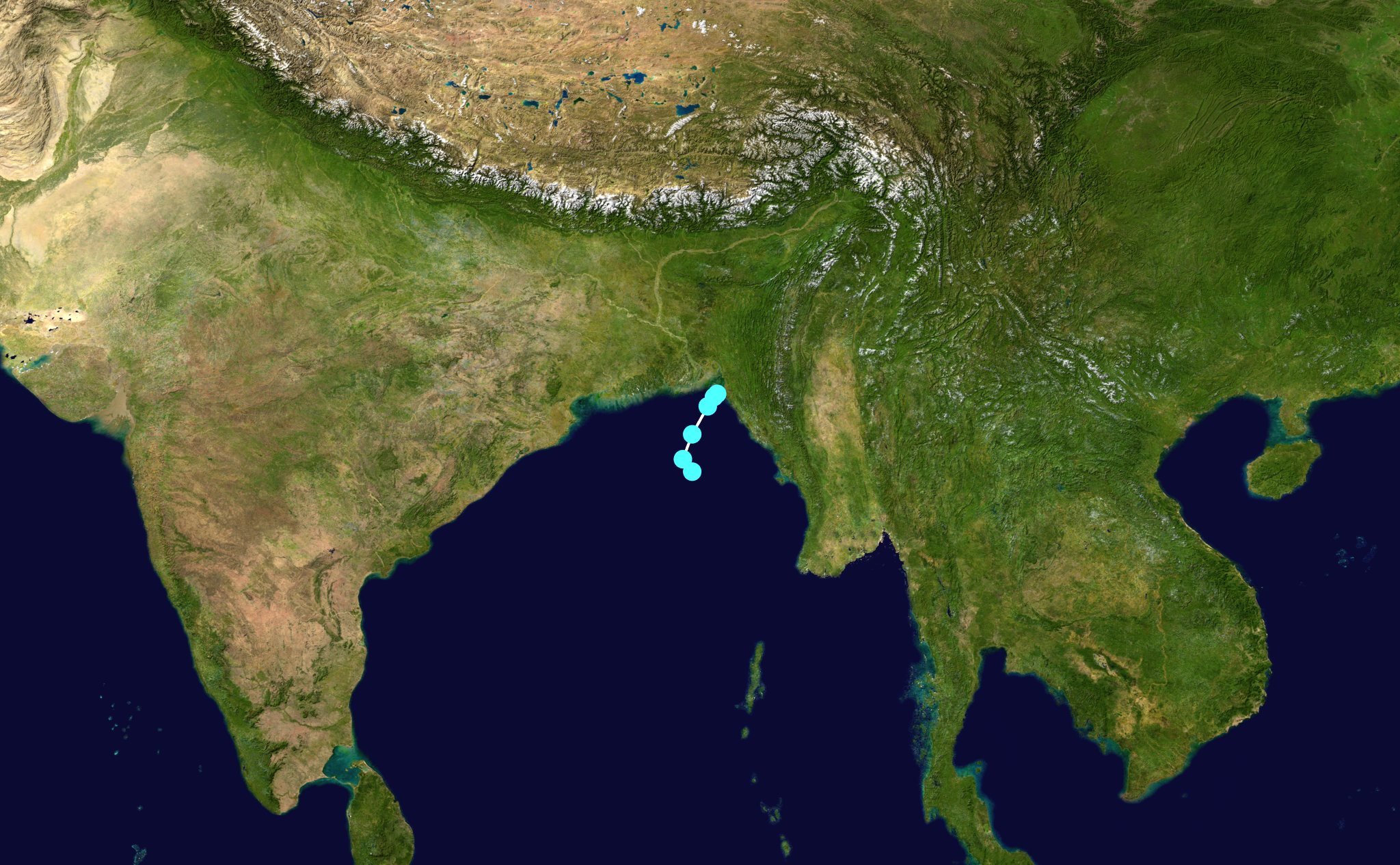
- Duration: October 14 – October 15
- Peak intensity: 100 km/h (65 mph) (3-min);

The remnants of Tropical Storm Herbert entered the basin on October 12 and redeveloped into a deep depression on October 14. Herbert reintensified into a 65 mph severe cyclonic storm before making landfall in Bangladesh on October 15 and dissipating thereafter.

=== Extremely Severe Cyclonic Storm BOB 03 ===
- Extremely severe cyclonic storm (IMD)
- Tropical storm (SSHWS)
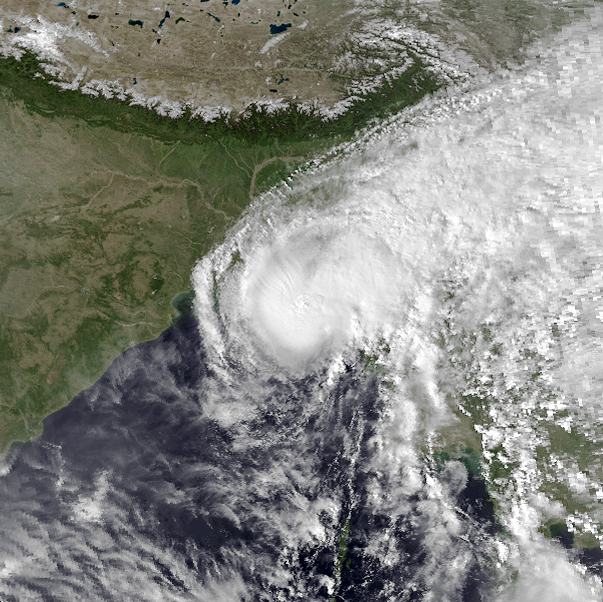
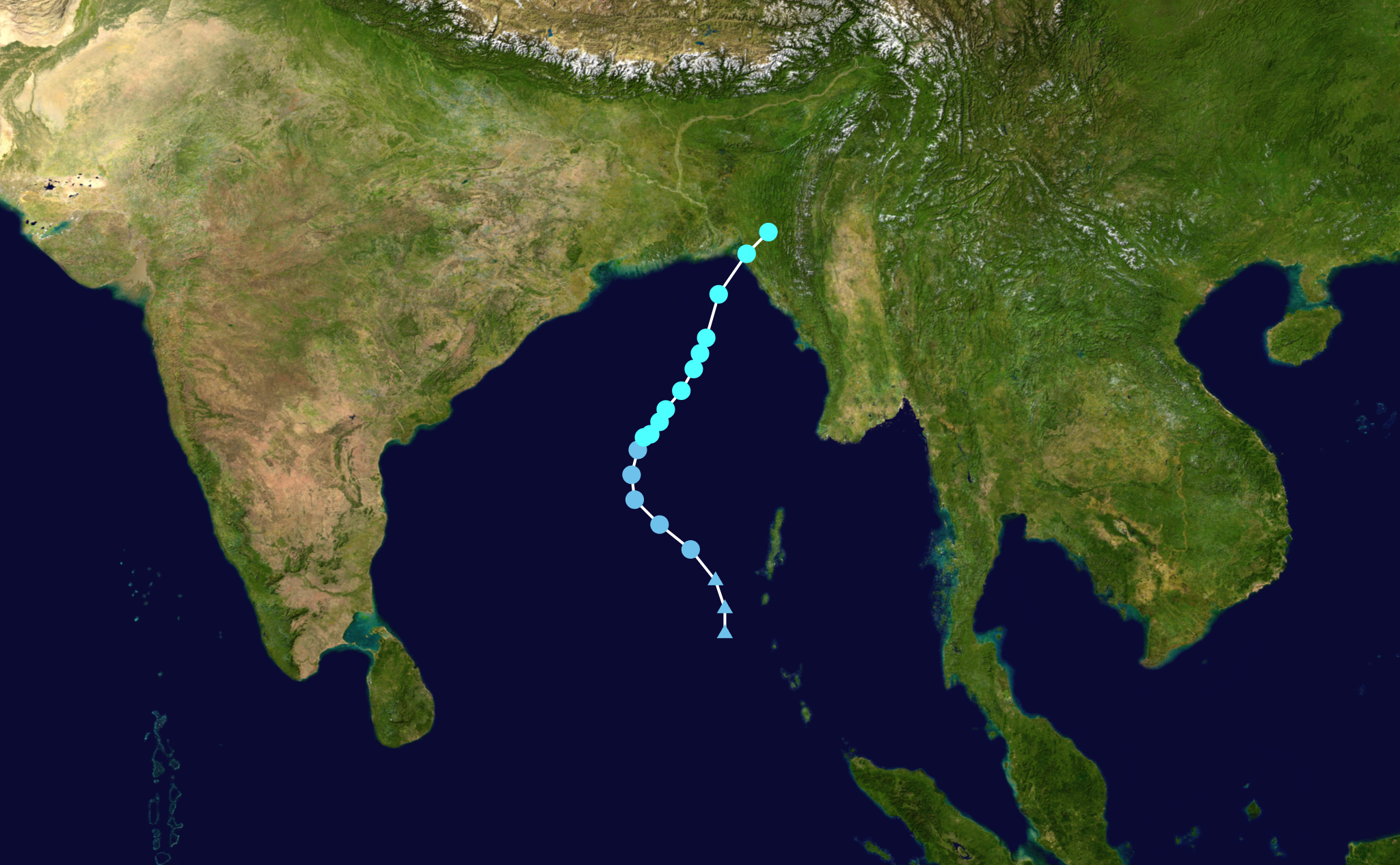
- Duration: November 5 – November 9
- Peak intensity: 165 km/h (105 mph) (3-min); 980 hPa (mbar)

65 mph Tropical Storm Three, which developed on November 5 in the central Bay of Bengal, hit southeastern Bangladesh on the 9th. The storm quickly dissipated without causing any reported damage.

=== Depression BOB 04 ===
- Depression (IMD)
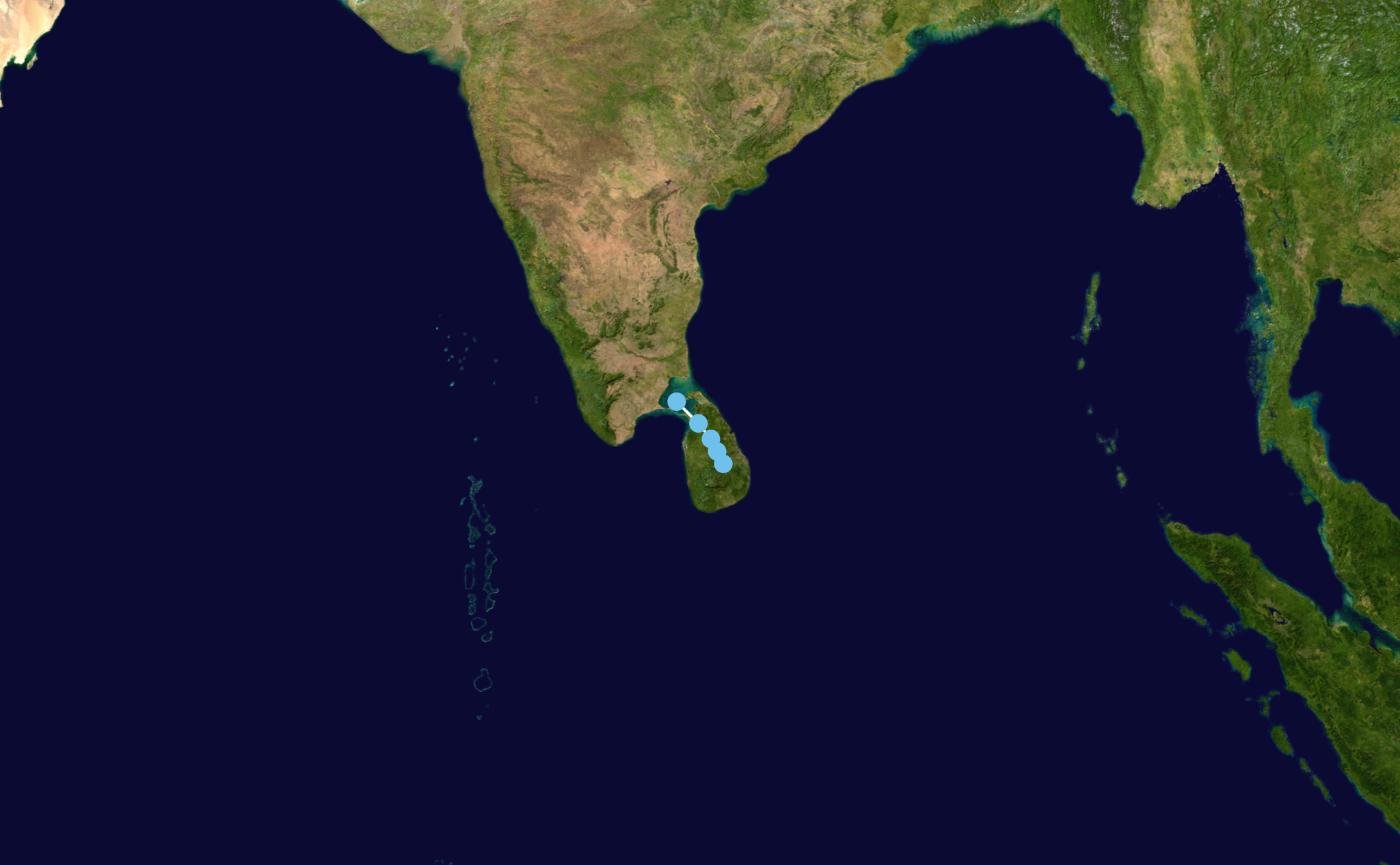
- Duration: December 21 – December 22
- Peak intensity: 45 km/h (30 mph) (3-min);

A weak tropical depression formed over Sri Lanka on December 21, quickly dissipating.

=== Other systems ===
- A tropical storm, designated 02B by the JTWC, began its life on October 1 in the central Bay of Bengal. It impacted northeastern India on the 3rd as a 60 mph tropical storm, dissipating the next day. It was not recognized by the IMD.
- The remnants of Western Pacific Tropical Storm Kim redeveloped in the northeastern Bay of Bengal near Myanmar. It moved parallel the coastline, hit western Myanmar, and dissipated on the 20th. However, the storm was not recognized by the IMD similarly to 02B.

== See also ==
- North Indian Ocean tropical cyclone
- 1983 Atlantic hurricane season
- 1983 Pacific hurricane season
- 1983 Pacific typhoon season
- Australian cyclone seasons: 1982–83, 1983–84
- South Pacific cyclone seasons: 1982–83, 1983–84
- South-West Indian Ocean cyclone seasons: 1982–83, 1983–84
