= Tropical Storm Dean (1983) =

Atlantic tropical storm in 1983

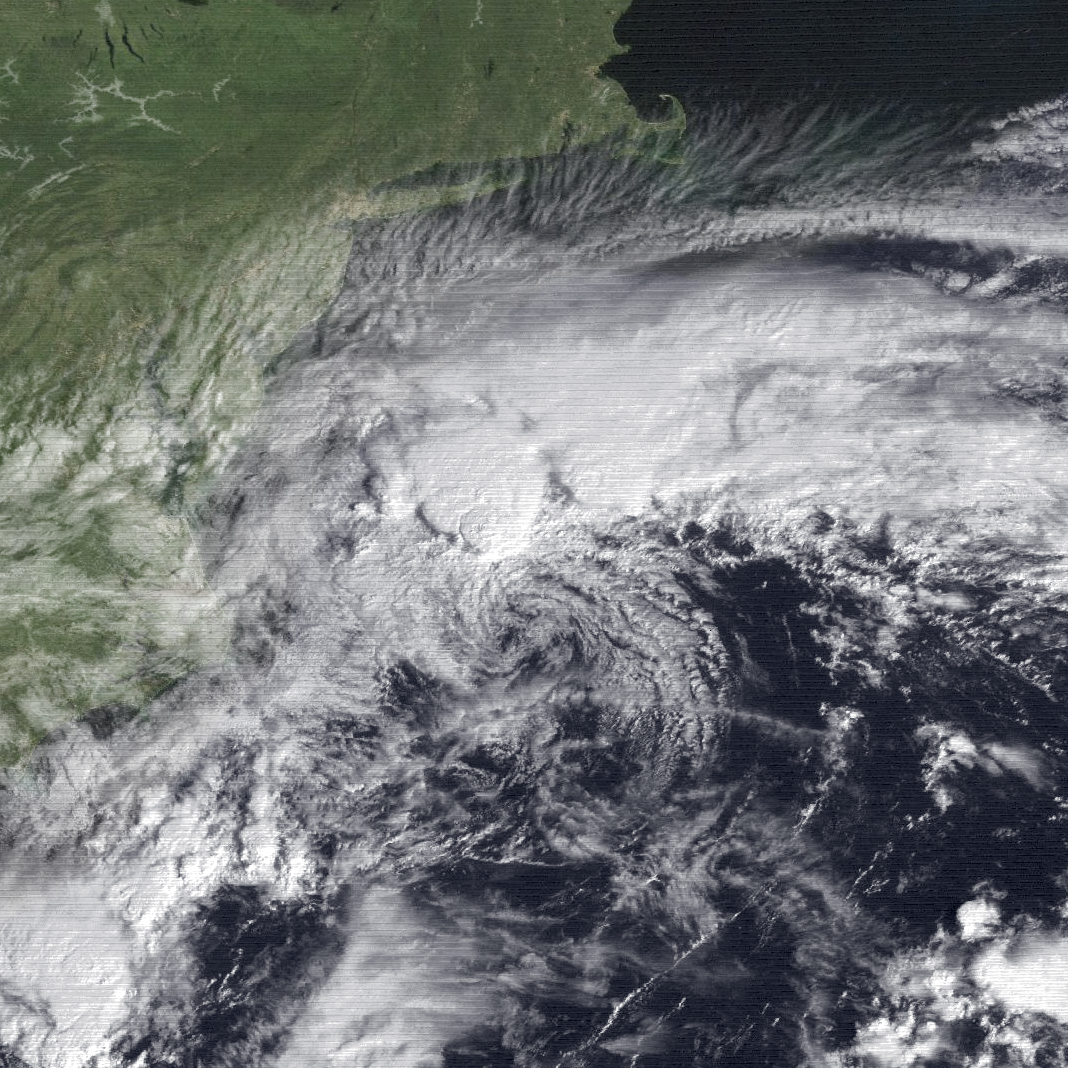
- Tropical Storm Dean at peak intensity near the Delmarva Peninsula on September 29

Meteorological history
- Formed: September 26, 1983
- Dissipated: September 30, 1983

Tropical storm
- 1-minute sustained (SSHWS/NWS)
- Highest winds: 65 mph (100 km/h)
- Lowest pressure: 999 mbar (hPa); 29.50 inHg

Overall effects
- Fatalities: None
- Areas affected: Mid-Atlantic, New England, North Carolina, Virginia
- IBTrACS
- Part of the 1983 Atlantic hurricane season

Tropical Storm Dean caused minor flooding along portions of the East Coast of the United States in September 1983. The seventh and final tropical cyclone of the very inactive 1983 Atlantic hurricane season, Dean developed from a frontal low to the northeast of the Bahamas on September 26. Initially subtropical, it gained characteristics of a tropical cyclone while tracking slowly north-northeastward. By September 27, the system was reclassified as Tropical Storm Dean. While tracking northward on September 28, Dean peaked with winds of 65 mph (100 km/h), shortly before curving west-northwestward and slowly leveling-off in intensity. Eventually, Dean made landfall in Virginia on the Delmarva Peninsula on September 29 as a weakening tropical storm. Dean rapidly weakened over land and was no longer classifiable as a tropical cyclone by early on October 1.

Offshore Virginia, swells generated by the storm stranded a tugboat and injured two people. Waves along the coast also caused beach erosion, especially in Virginia and North Carolina. Inland, effects were minor and generally limited to mostly light rainfall. More than 100 campers on the Outer Banks of North Carolina were forced to evacuate due to flooding on North Carolina Highway 12. Although near-hurricane-force wind gusts pelted coastal areas of Virginia and North Carolina, wind damage from the storm was minimal. The remnants of the storm brought rainfall to portions of New England, especially to Connecticut, where precipitation from the storm peaked at 4.62 in (117 mm). Damage from the storm was unknown, but presumed to be minimal.

== Meteorological history ==
Map plotting the storm's track and intensity, according to the Saffir–Simpson scale Map key Saffir–Simpson scale Tropical depression (≤38 mph, ≤62 km/h) Tropical storm (39–73 mph, 63–118 km/h) Category 1 (74–95 mph, 119–153 km/h) Category 2 (96–110 mph, 154–177 km/h) Category 3 (111–129 mph, 178–208 km/h) Category 4 (130–156 mph, 209–251 km/h) Category 5 (≥157 mph, ≥252 km/h) Unknown Storm type Tropical cyclone Subtropical cyclone Extratropical cyclone, remnant low, tropical disturbance, or monsoon depression

A frontal cloud band moved offshore the East Coast of the United States on September 22. During the next few days, the cloud band became stationary while stretching from The Bahamas to northeast of Bermuda. Around that time, a 1,035 mbar (30.6 inHg) high pressure stalled over the Northeastern United States, producing a strong pressure gradient and gale force winds over the East Coast of the United States. While located about 455 mi (732 km) east of Vero Beach, Florida, a low-level circulation developed within the frontal cloud band on September 26. At around 1800 UTC that day, the NHC classified the system as a subtropical storm, due to a ship report of gale force winds 230 mi (370 km) from the center. Initially, it tracked north-northeastward under the influence of the frontal cloud band that spawned the storm. The wind field quickly condensed, while the storm itself separated from the frontal cloud band. As a result, it was re-classified as Tropical Storm Dean at 1800 UTC on September 27 while approximately 575 mi (925 km) east of Jacksonville, Florida. The National Hurricane Center, which initiated advisories on the storm at 2200 UTC on the same day, indicated that a weak ridge to the north and a cold low moving offshore of the Southeastern United States would cause Dean to move slowly and possibly curve northwestward.

Early on September 28, a reconnaissance aircraft recorded Dean's minimum barometric pressure of 999 mbar (29.5 inHg). Although forecast models initially indicated that the storm would continue northeastward, they quickly switched to a westward movement on September 29. After curving northwestward later that day, Dean attained its maximum sustained wind speed of 65 mph (100 km/h), as reported by a ship. While a reconnaissance aircraft flew into Dean north of center late on September 29, it reported hurricane-force wind gusts. However, the storm soon began to weaken. At around 1200 UTC on September 30, Dean made landfall in Virginia on the Delmarva Peninsula with winds of 45 mph (75 km/h). Operationally, the National Hurricane Center discontinued advisories four hours after Dean struck the state. At 1800 UTC on September 30, the storm weakened to a tropical depression. At 0000 UTC on October 1, Dean became unidentifiable as a tropical cyclone while located over Virginia near the mouth of the Potomac River. The remnants continued northwestward, before curving to the northeast while near the border of Virginia and West Virginia. It crossed the Mid-Atlantic and New England before re-emerging into the Atlantic Ocean near Boston, Massachusetts. By October 2, the remnants of Dean had dissipated just offshore of the East Coast of the United States.

== Preparations and impact ==
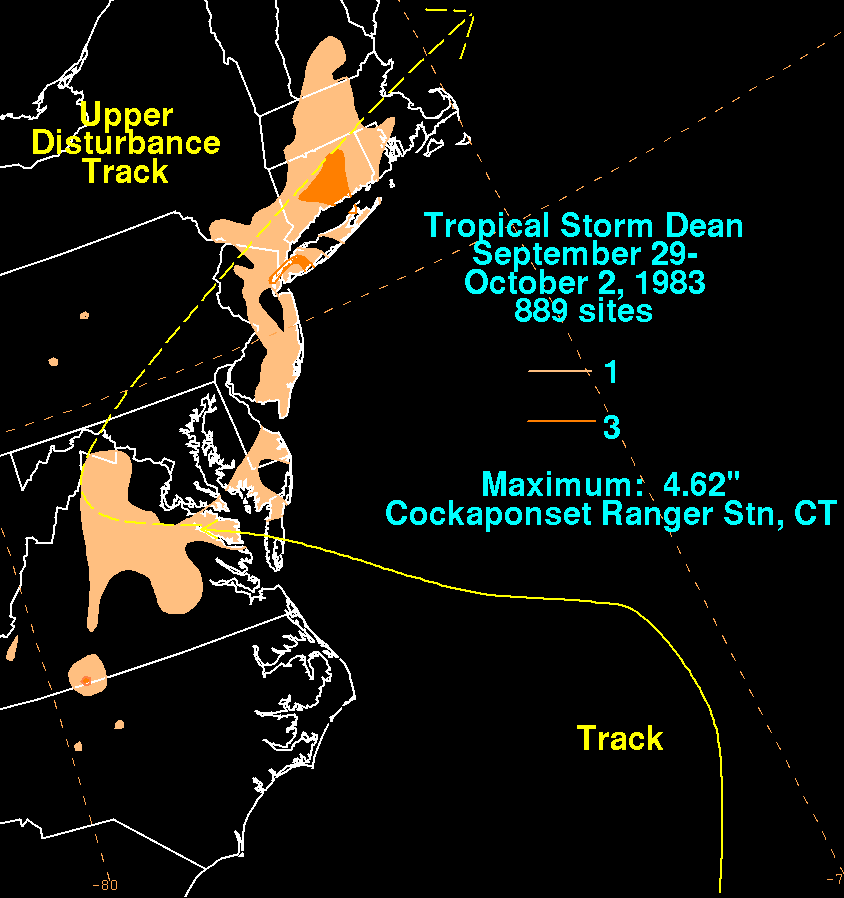
Rainfall from Tropical Storm Dean in the Eastern United States

As Dean approached the United States, numerous gale warnings were issued. Many of these warnings were issued from North Carolina up to Rhode Island. Small craft advisories were also raised along much of the eastern seaboard, covering places between Cape Cod, Massachusetts to Jupiter Inlet, Florida. In Norfolk, Virginia, the naval station was placed under "hurricane condition 3", meaning that destructive winds were anticipated within 48 hours. In parts of North Carolina, residents were urged to prepare for the storm and remain out of the rough coastal waters.

As the storm moved inland over Virginia, its outer bands and high winds prompted more than 100 campers on Ocracoke Island and Cape Hatteras to evacuate after 1 ft (0.30 m) of water flooded North Carolina Highway 12. Along the coast, wave between 6 and 10 ft (1.8 and 3.0 m) were measured. Minor beach erosion ensued, although some beaches lost as much as 20 ft (6.1 m) of sand. Squall lines associated with Dean brought near-hurricane-force wind gusts and brief, heavy rainfall. Winds caused little effect other than isolated power outages, especially on the Outer Banks. Aside from the minor damage caused by Dean, there was also a positive side to the storm. Throughout coastal waters off North Carolina, king mackerel appeared in near-record numbers, improving the local fishing industry. Some catchers stated that they were finding some fish weighing up to 30 lb (14 kg).

About 300 mi (480 km) off the coast of Virginia, large swells from Dean stranded a tugboat on September 29 with six people on board. Two of the crew were injured during the incident; however, they were not seriously hurt. The ship was towed to Cape May, New Jersey later that day by the United States Coast Guard. Waves up to 8 ft (2.4 m) caused beach erosion across the Virginia coastline. In addition to minor erosion, waves caused "slight flooding" at Buckroe Beach, totaling to $500 to $5,000 in damage (1983 USD). Although winds were estimated to have been around 60 mph (95 km/h) as the storm moved inland, structural damage was minimal. Many areas near Dean's path experienced light rainfall of 1 to 3 in (25 to 76 mm) of rain, especially in Virginia where the statewide peak was 1.29 in (33 mm) in Richmond.

In Maryland, thousands of tons of sand was removed by rough seas near Ocean City; beach erosion also occurred at nearby Assateague Island. Additionally, wind gusts between 50 and 55 mph (80 and 89 km/h) resulted in minor damage, while minimal flooding was reported following rainfall. Damage in Maryland was light, totaling to between $500 and $5,000 (1983 USD). Minor effects were reported in Delaware, limited to winds gusts up to 50 mph (80 km/h), which caused the loss of tons of sand along beaches. In coastal New Jersey, locally heavy rainfall resulted in traffic jams, downed power lines, and numerous commuting problems. In some areas of New York, especially in the southeastern portions of the state, rainfall exceeding 2 in (51 mm) in 24 hours flooded roadways and delayed trains. The remnants of Dean dropped light precipitation in New England. Rainfall from the storm peaked at 4.62 in (117 mm) at the Cockaponset Ranger Station in Connecticut.

== See also ==
- Other storms of the same name
- Tropical Storm Bret (1981)
- Tropical Storm Danielle (1992)
