= 1983 Atlantic hurricane season =

- Season summary map

Seasonal boundaries
- First system formed: July 23, 1983
- Last system dissipated: September 30, 1983

Strongest storm
- Name: Alicia
  - Maximum winds: 115 mph (185 km/h) (1-minute sustained)
  - Lowest pressure: 962 mbar (hPa; 28.41 inHg)

Seasonal statistics
- Total depressions: 6
- Total storms: 4 (Record low in the satellite era)
- Hurricanes: 3
- Major hurricanes (Cat. 3+): 1
- Total fatalities: 21 total
- Total damage: $3 billion (1983 USD)

Related articles
- Timeline of the 1983 Atlantic hurricane season; 1983 Pacific hurricane season; 1983 Pacific typhoon season; 1983 North Indian Ocean cyclone season

The 1983 Atlantic hurricane season was the least active Atlantic hurricane season in the satellite era and the least active overall since 1930. The season officially began on June 1, 1983, and lasted until November 30, 1983. These dates conventionally delimit the period of each year when most storms form in the Atlantic basin. The season had very little activity, with only seven tropical depressions, four of which reached tropical storm strength or higher. This led to the lowest accumulated cyclone energy count since 1977.

The season began later than normal; the first tropical depression formed on July 23 and the second on July 27. Neither tropical depressions strengthened and they dissipated soon thereafter. Hurricane Alicia formed as Tropical Depression Three on August 15, quickly intensified into a hurricane on August 16 and made landfall in Texas on August 18. Alicia caused $3 billion in damage in Texas. Hurricane Barry formed on August 25, crossed Florida and strengthened into a hurricane. Barry made landfall near the Mexico–United States border, and dissipated over land on August 30.

Hurricane Chantal, the third and final hurricane in 1983, formed on September 10. It strengthened into a hurricane, but stayed out at sea, and was absorbed by a frontal system on September 15. Tropical Depression Six formed on September 18 and caused heavy rains in the Caribbean before degenerating into a wave on September 20. Tropical Storm Dean was the final storm of the season, forming on September 26. It originally tracked to the north, peaking at 65 mph (105 km/h) winds, and made landfall in the Delmarva Peninsula on September 29. It dissipated over the coast of Virginia on the following day.

== Seasonal forecasts ==
Predictions of tropical activity in the 1983 season
Source	Date	Named storms	Hurricanes	Major hurricanes	Ref
Average (1981–2010)		12.1	6.4	2.7
Record high activity		30	15	7†
Record low activity		1	0†	0†
CSU	July 23, 1983	8	5	N/A
	Actual activity	4	3	1
† Most recent of several such occurrences. (See all)

Forecasts of hurricane activity are issued before each hurricane season by noted hurricane experts such as Dr. William M. Gray and his associates at Colorado State University (CSU). A normal season, as defined by the National Oceanic and Atmospheric Administration (NOAA) in the period from 1981 to 2010, has approximately 12 named storms, with 6 of those reaching hurricane status. About 3 hurricane strengthen into major hurricanes, which are tropical cyclones that reach at least Category 3 intensity on the Saffir–Simpson scale.

The July 23, 1983, forecasters at CSU predicted that after the slow start to the season, a total of eight tropical storms would develop, and five of the storms would reach hurricane status. The forecast did not specify how many of the hurricanes would reach major hurricane status. CSU based this prediction on an ongoing El Niño event, sea-level pressures, and wind currents. However, the prediction issued by CSU proved to be too high, with only four named storms forming by the end of the season and three of those reaching hurricane status. The CSU attributed the overforecast to the El Niño event being stronger and more persistent than they expected.

== Seasonal summary ==
Least intense Atlantic hurricane seasons (since 1965)
Rank	Season	ACE value
1	1983	17.4
2	1977	25.3
3	1982	31.5
4	1994	32.0
5	1987	34.4
6	1991	35.5
7	1972	35.6
8	1986	35.8
9	2013	36.1
10	1993	38.7
(source)

The season, which began on June 1 and ended on November 30, was very inactive because of strong upper-level wind shear. The wind shear was unusually strong throughout the Caribbean and open Atlantic, and disrupted convection in areas of disturbed weather so they could not develop. Over 60 African systems had formed and made it westward, but when they reached the Lesser Antilles, they were dissolved easily. The only area where the shear was minimal—a region encompassing the Gulf of Mexico and the Atlantic north of the Bahamas and east of Florida—was where the four named storms developed. Another contributing factor to the low number of storms may have been the decaying 1982–83 El Niño event. The season total of four named storms was the fewest in the satellite era, while the 1983 season was the least active since 1930, which had only three storms. This season and the previous became the first example of two consecutive years to have no storms form in the Caribbean since reliable record began. Additionally, the 1983 season was the first on record in which a system did not reach tropical storm intensity south of 25°N latitude.

The National Hurricane Center also issued numeric landfall probabilities for the first time in 1983. Probabilities had been calculated for prior storms for use in the issuing of hurricane watches and warnings, but this was the first time the raw numeric probabilities were released to the public. The probabilities issued were accurate during Alicia, indicating that Galveston and surrounding portions of the upper Texas coast were the most likely area to be struck.

Tropical cyclogenesis began on July 23, when Tropical Depression One formed over the deep Atlantic. After crossing the Windward Islands, the depression dissipated over the eastern Caribbean on July 28. As the previous system moved across the Caribbean, another depression formed on July 27 to the southwest of the Cape Verde Islands. The depression traversed the Atlantic in a west-northwestward direction and also failed to reach tropical storm intensity before dissipating near the northern Leeward Islands on August 2. Later in August, hurricanes Alicia and Barry developed. The former also became the most intense tropical cyclone of the season, peaking as a Category 3 hurricane with maximum sustained winds of 115 mph (185 km/h). Alicia caused 21 fatalities and approximately $3 billion in damage, mostly in Texas. Three tropical cyclones formed in September – Hurricane Chantal, Tropical Depression Six, and Tropical Storm Dean. The dissipation of Dean on September 30 marked the end of tropical cyclone activity.

The season's activity was reflected with a very low cumulative accumulated cyclone energy (ACE) rating of 17, one of the lowest on record, which is classified as "below normal". ACE is a metric used to express the energy used by a tropical cyclone during its lifetime. Therefore, storms that last a long time, as well as particularly strong hurricanes, have high ACEs. It is only calculated for full advisories on tropical systems at or exceeding 39 mph (63 km/h), which is the threshold for tropical storm intensity.

== Systems ==
=== Tropical Depression One ===
- Tropical depression (SSHWS)
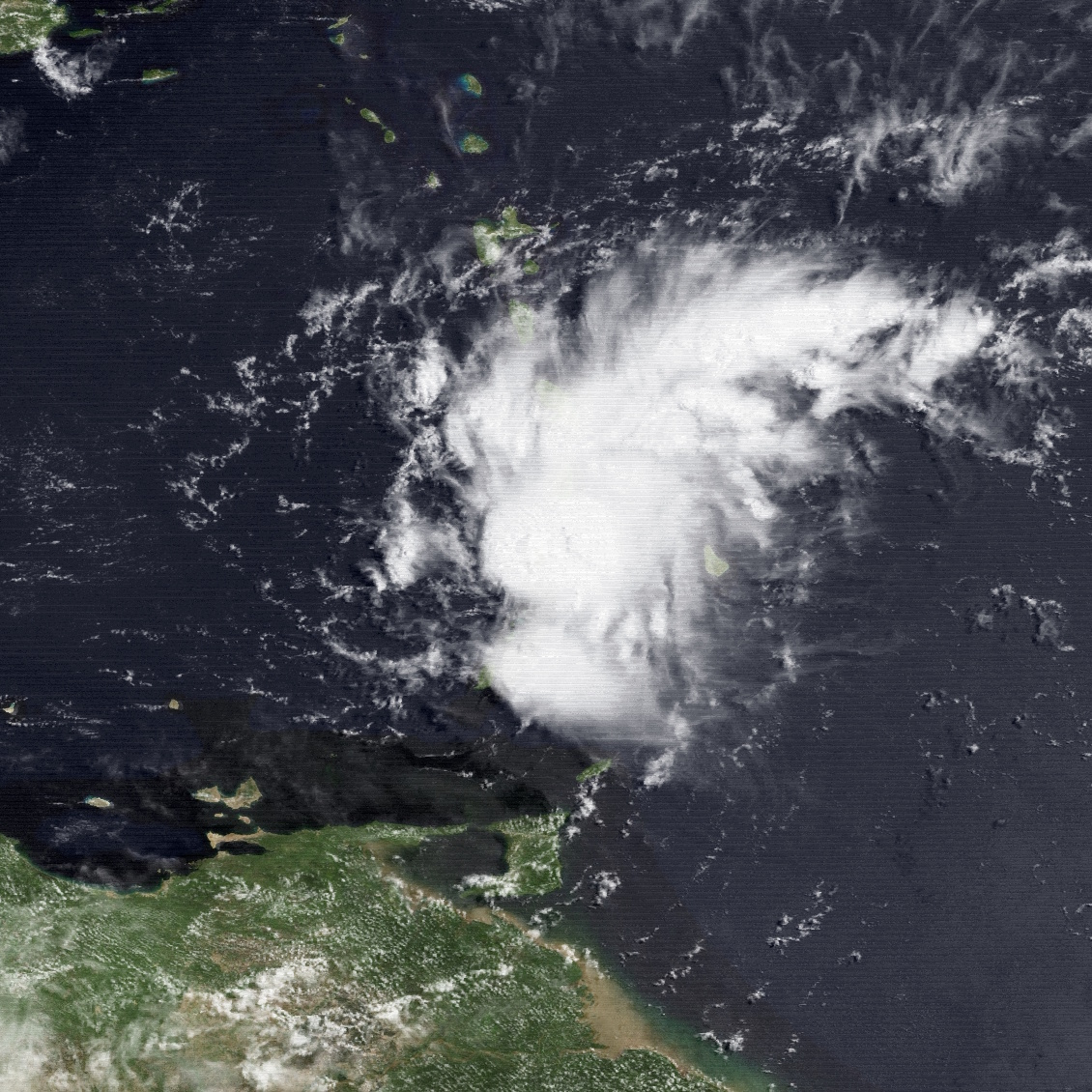
- Duration: July 23 – July 28
- Peak intensity: 35 mph (55 km/h) (1-min);

Tropical Depression One developed about halfway between French Guiana and the Cape Verde Islands on July 23. The National Hurricane Center indicated the possibility of the depression strengthening into a tropical storm in media reports, but upper-level wind shear inhibited any development. The depression dissipated over the eastern Caribbean late on July 28.

=== Tropical Depression Two ===
- Tropical depression (SSHWS)
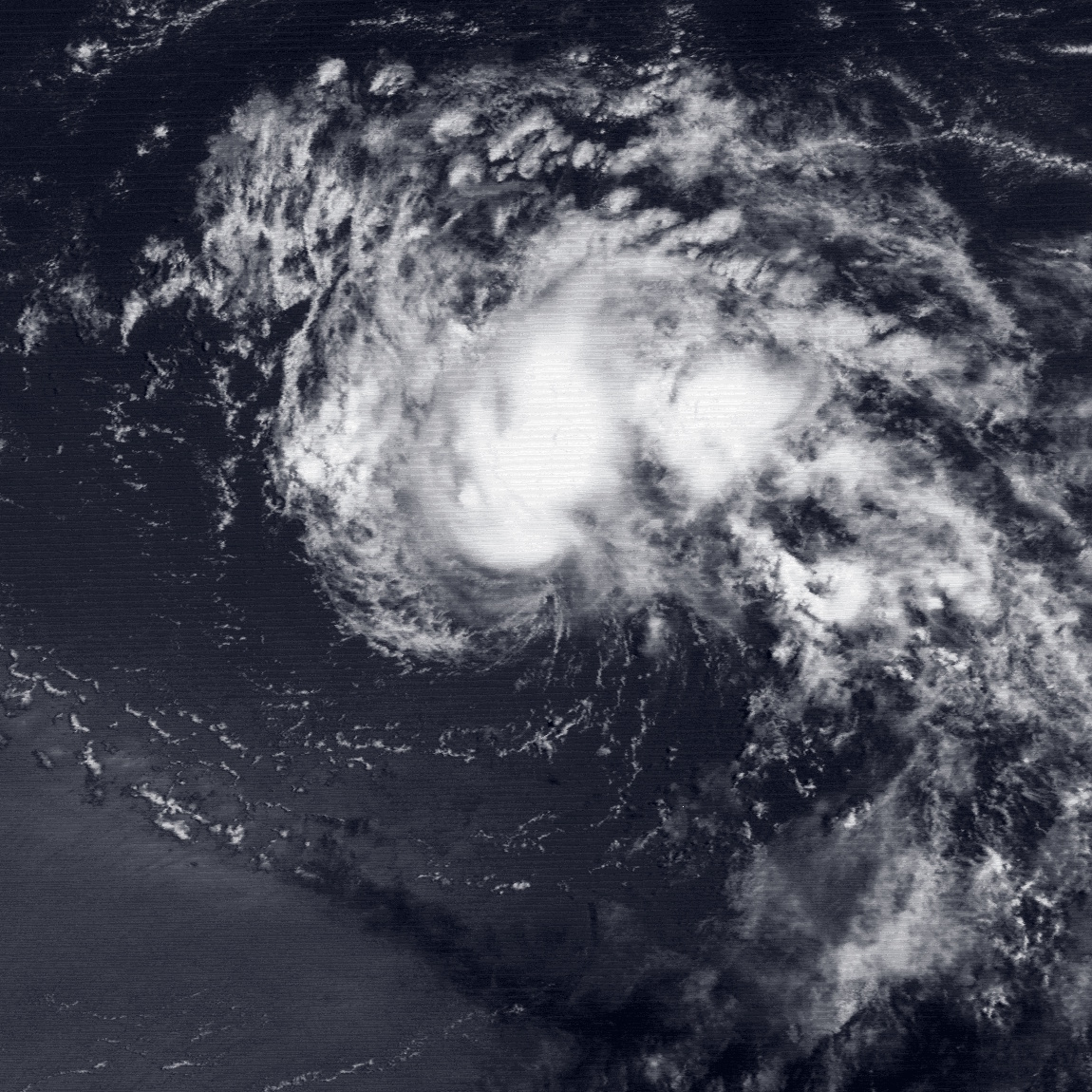
- Duration: July 27 – August 2
- Peak intensity: 35 mph (55 km/h) (1-min);

An area of disturbed weather organized into a tropical depression southwest of the Cape Verde Islands on July 27. The depression moved generally west-northwestward across the deep Atlantic for several days, but failed to strengthened significantly due to strong upper-level wind shear. The depression dissipated near the northern Leeward Islands on August 2.

=== Hurricane Alicia ===
- Category 3 hurricane (SSHWS)
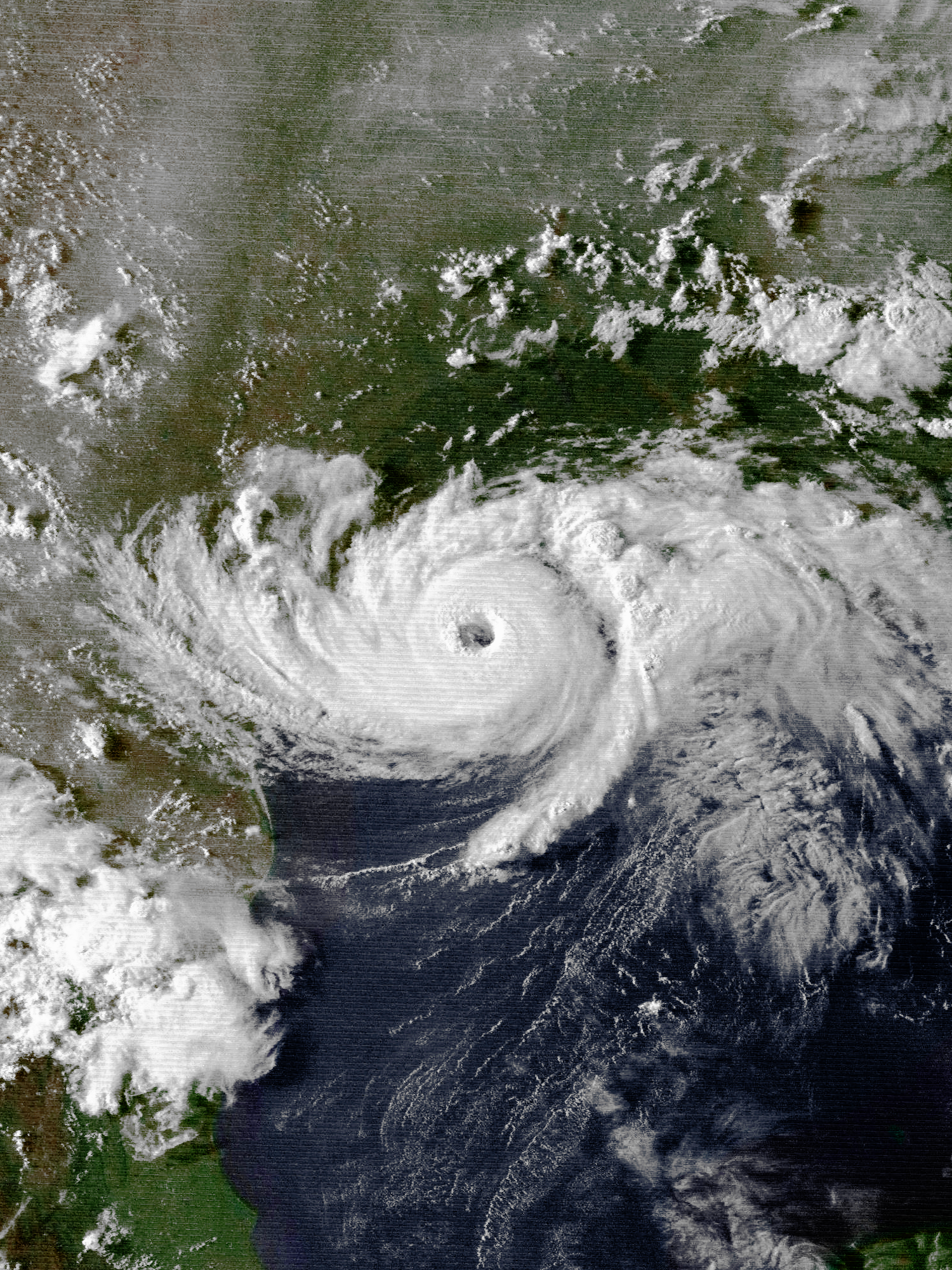
- Duration: August 15 – August 20
- Peak intensity: 115 mph (185 km/h) (1-min); 962 mbar (hPa)

The system that would become Hurricane Alicia originated from the western end of a frontal trough that stretched from New England to the Gulf of Mexico. Satellite pictures showed a meso-scale low-pressure area that had moved off the Alabama and Mississippi coasts near the trough and was possibly the precursor system to Alicia. Pressures in the Gulf of Mexico were high and stayed high during the early development stages. On August 15, a ship recorded a minimal pressure of 1015 millibars (29.99 inHg), when the system was upgraded into Tropical Storm Alicia. With high environmental pressures around it, Alicia remained a small system.

Steering currents above Alicia remained weak during the storm's lifetime. However, a ridge was well formed to the north of the developing storms. With fluctuations in the pressures, Alicia began to drift to west on August 16. This was short-lived, as Alicia turned to the northwest towards Texas. During the period of August 16 to August 18, an anticyclone had formed over Alicia and along with slow movement over warm waters, caused Alicia to intensify rapidly. The pressure in Alicia decreased one millibar an hour in the 40 hours before landfall. Alicia peaked at 115 mph (185 km/h) in winds and 962 millibars (28.4 inHg) in pressure on August 18. Alicia made landfall near Galveston on August 18 as a Category 3 hurricane. Alicia weakened quickly over land and accelerated over the Midwest, before dissipating over Nebraska on August 21.

As Alicia moved northward, the remnants caused moderate to heavy rainfall in several states. Houston suffered heavy damage, including thousands of shattered glass panes from downtown skyscrapers. Overall, Alicia killed 21 people and caused $3 billion (1983 USD) in damage.

=== Hurricane Barry ===
- Category 1 hurricane (SSHWS)
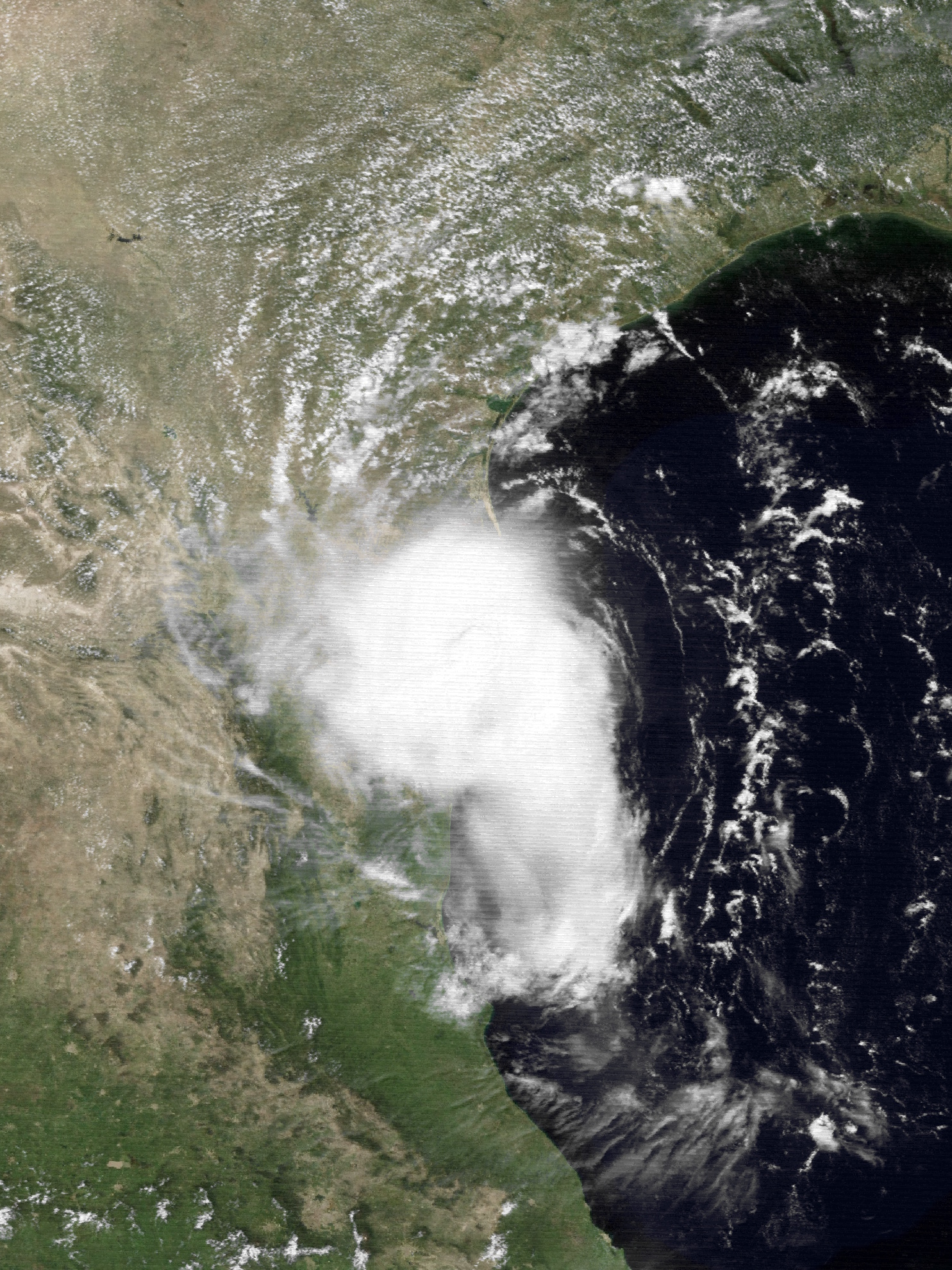
- Duration: August 23 – August 29
- Peak intensity: 80 mph (130 km/h) (1-min); 986 mbar (hPa)

Hurricane Barry originated from a tropical disturbance that left the Northwestern African coast on August 13. Most of the season, the northwestern tropical Atlantic Ocean had upper-level wind shear, which had inhibited development of systems. Due to these conditions, the disturbance was unable to strengthen until August 22 as it was approaching the Bahamas. A weak trough moved the disturbance into an area of low wind shear, and the disturbance intensified into Tropical Depression Four on the evening of August 23. The depression was just to the northeast of the northern Bahamian Islands where it strengthened into Tropical Storm Barry on the morning of August 24.

Tropical Storm Barry subsequently turned to the west into an area of increased wind shear and weakened rapidly. It was able to make landfall near Melbourne, Florida, on the morning of August 25 as a 45 mph tropical storm, before weakening to a tropical depression over Florida. After Tropical Depression Barry emerged from central Florida, it was still under pressure from high-level winds. The depression entered the central Gulf of Mexico, and after meandering west for a day or so, returned to tropical storm strength. Just off the coast of Mexico, Barry rapidly intensified into a hurricane on August 28, just before making landfall near Matamoros that afternoon. Before landfall, Barry peaked with 80 mph (130 km/h) winds and a pressure of 986 millibars (29.11 inHg). The remnants quickly dissipated over the Sierra Madre Oriental on August 29.

=== Hurricane Chantal ===
- Category 1 hurricane (SSHWS)
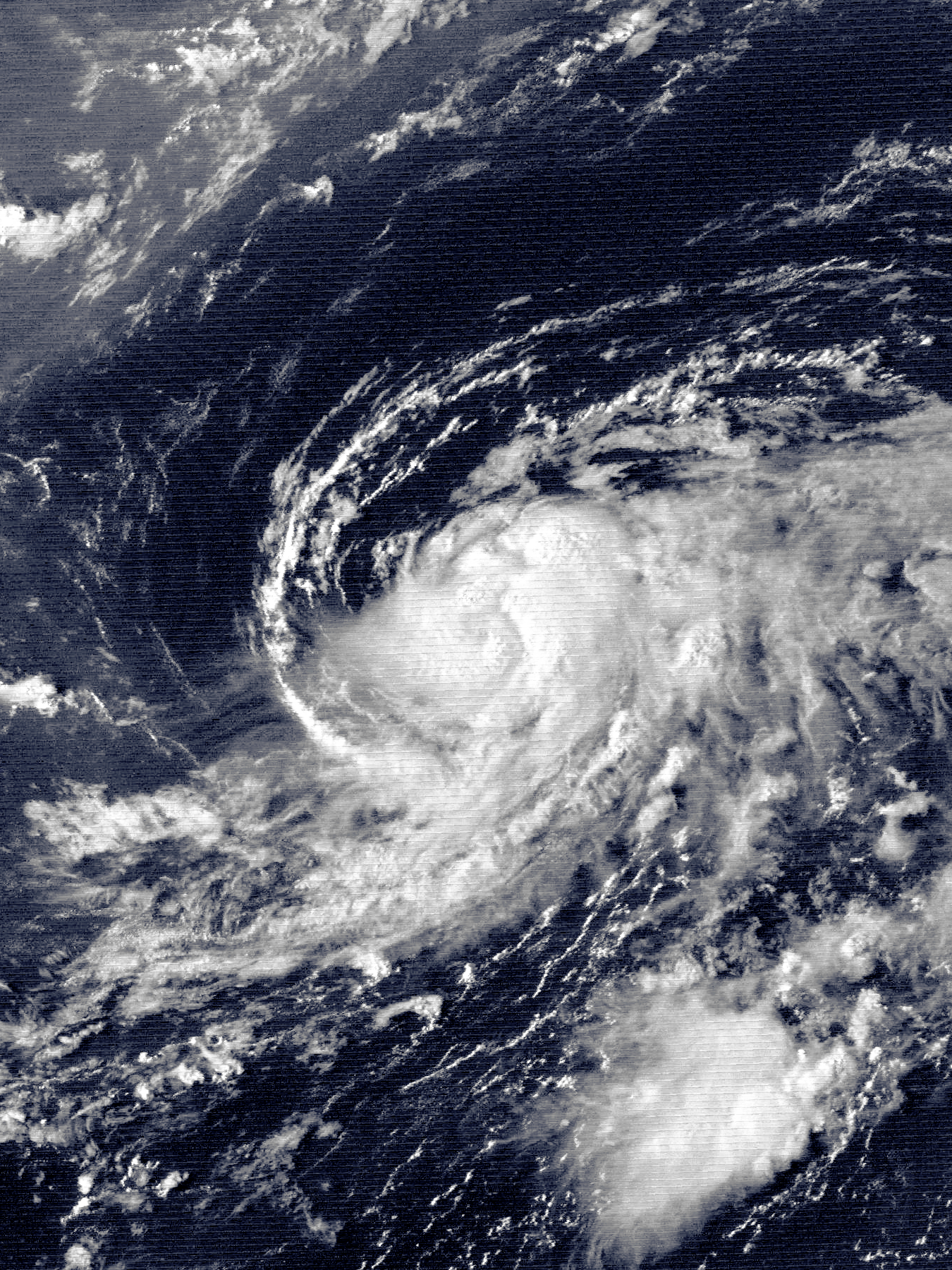
- Duration: September 10 – September 15
- Peak intensity: 75 mph (120 km/h) (1-min); 994 mbar (hPa)

The precursor low to Chantal originated from a large envelope of low pressure on the morning of September 10. The disturbed weather, nested off the coast of Bermuda, was one of the remnants of an old frontal trough that had extended from Hispaniola to the central north Atlantic Ocean. This particular area of disturbed weather become part of the northeast portion of a low-pressure system. On September 10, a reconnaissance aircraft found sustained winds of 30 mph (50 km/h) and a 1010 millibar (29.83 inHg) pressure reading, indicating development into a tropical depression.

The depression moved to within 100 miles (160 kilometers) of Bermuda and slowly intensified. Late that afternoon, Tropical Depression Five had intensified into a 40 mph (65 km/h) storm and was named Chantal. Chantal intensified rapidly, intensifying to hurricane status late on September 11. It then turned to the east and gained a weak upper-level cirrus-cloud outflow. The structure of the system changed little over the next 24 hours, before Chantal lost organization and was downgraded to a tropical storm on the night of the 12th.

Overnight, all convection in Chantal dissipated, and its forward speed decreased as it headed north. A frontal system attracted and absorbed the remnants of Chantal by the night of September 14. Effects on Bermuda were minimal, with the island getting winds only up to 20 mph (30 km/h) and a few thundershowers. However, Chantal generated swells of 30–40 ft (9.1–12.2 m) offshore.

=== Tropical Storm Dean ===
- Tropical storm (SSHWS)
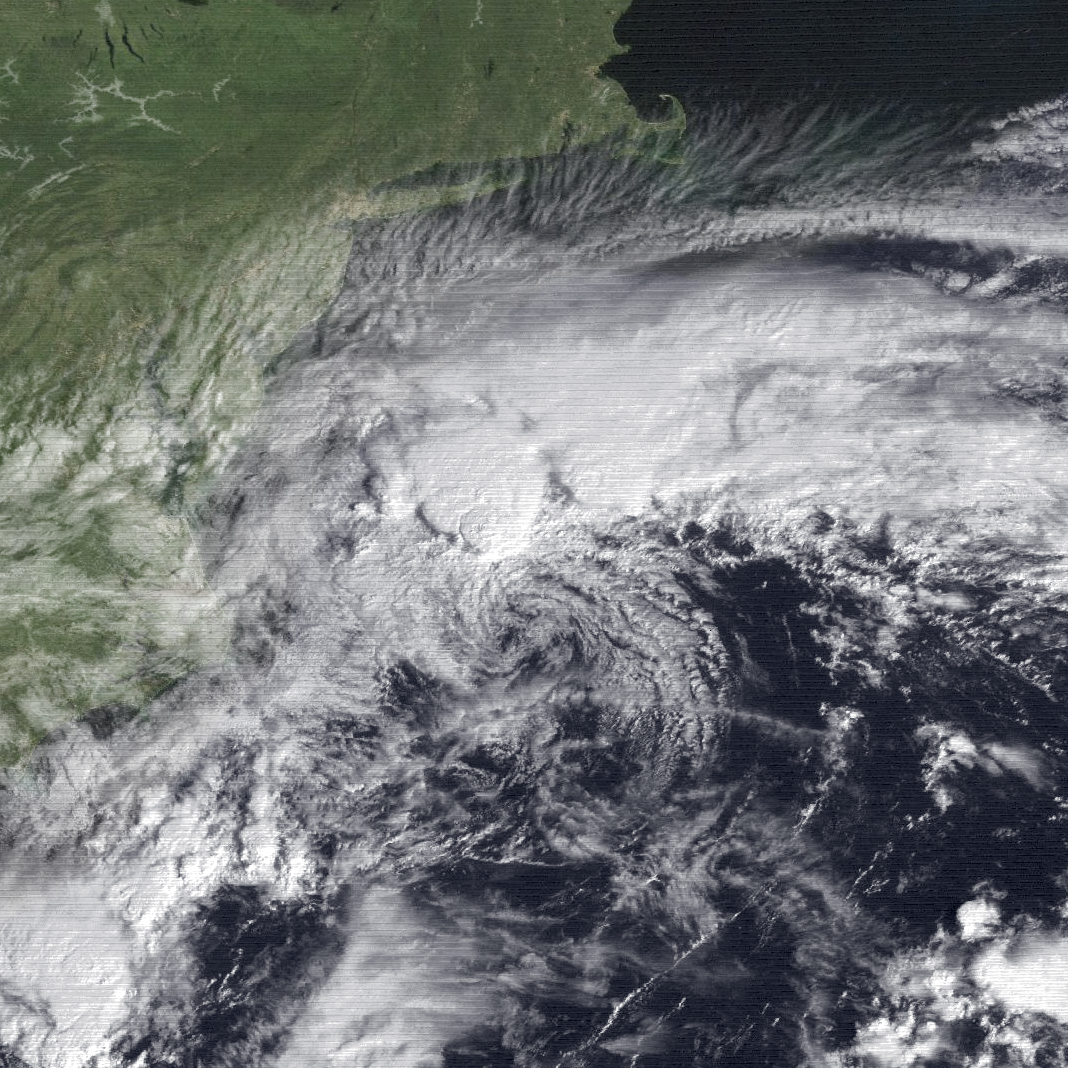
- Duration: September 26 – September 30
- Peak intensity: 65 mph (100 km/h) (1-min); 999 mbar (hPa)

A frontal cloud band moved off the East Coast of the United States on September 22. During the next few days, the band became stationary from the Bahamas to beyond Bermuda. A high-pressure area then settled over the northeastern United States, resulting in a strong pressure gradient and winds near gale-force along the east coast. A low-level circulation formed from the frontal cloud band on September 26 about 460 mi (740 km) east of central Florida. Dean was first identified late on September 26 as a subtropical storm, though an Air Force reconnaissance flight on the following day only reported winds of 35 mph (55 km/h) at 23 mi (37 km) from the center. A pressure of 999 mbar (29.5 inHg) indicated that Dean was strengthening as it headed northward. Additionally, satellite pictures showed that the subtropical cyclone was emerging from the cloud. Consequently, the system became a tropical storm late on September 27. Dean's winds peaked at 65 mph (105 km/h) on September 28 as it headed northward. Dean's circulation turned to the northwest on September 29 then struck the Delmarva Peninsula and dissipated over land on September 30.

Gale warnings were from North Carolina to Rhode Island in association with Dean. Rainfall produced by the storm spread from the North Carolina–Virginia state line all the way to New England. Virginia reported rains of 1 in (25 mm) with 3 in (76 mm) at the border. Rains peaked at 4.62 in (117 mm) at Cockaponset Ranger Station in Connecticut. Damage was limited to minor beach erosion and flooding along the portion of Mid-Atlantic coast states.

=== Other system ===
A system operationally known as Tropical Depression Six was tracked from September 18 to 20 in the eastern Caribbean Sea and caused heavy rainfall in the Lesser Antilles, however it was later removed fom the Atlantic HURDAT database.

== Storm names ==
The following list of names was used for named storms that formed in the North Atlantic in 1983. Each name used this season was utilized for the first (and, in the case of Alicia, only) time.

- Alicia
- Barry
- Chantal
- Dean
- Erin (unused)
- Felix (unused)
- Gabrielle (unused)
- Hugo (unused)
- Iris (unused)
- Jerry (unused)
- Karen (unused)
- Luis (unused)
- Marilyn (unused)
- Noel (unused)
- Opal (unused)
- Pablo (unused)
- Roxanne (unused)
- Sebastien (unused)
- Tanya (unused)
- Van (unused)
- Wendy (unused)

=== Retirement ===
In the spring of 1984, the World Meteorological Organization retired the name Alicia from the rotating name lists due to the amount of damage and deaths it caused, and it will not be used again for another Atlantic hurricane. Alicia was replaced with Allison for the 1989 season.

== Season effects ==
This is a table of all of the storms that formed in the 1983 Atlantic hurricane season. It includes their name, duration, peak classification and intensities, areas affected, damage, and death totals. Deaths in parentheses are additional and indirect (an example of an indirect death would be a traffic accident), but were still related to that storm. Damage and deaths include totals while the storm was extratropical, a wave, or a low, and all of the damage figures are in 1983 USD.

Saffir–Simpson scale
TD	TS	C1	C2	C3	C4	C5

Name	Dates	Peak intensity			Areas affected	Damage (USD)	Deaths	Ref(s).
Name	Dates	Category	Wind speed	Pressure	Areas affected	Damage (USD)	Deaths	Ref(s).
One	July 23–28	Tropical depression	35 mph (55 km/h)	Not specified	None	None	None	
Two	July 27 – August 2	Tropical depression	35 mph (55 km/h)	Not specified	None	None	None	
Alicia	August 15–20	Category 3 hurricane	115 mph (185 km/h)	962 hPa (28.41 inHg)	Eastern Texas, Central United States	$3 billion	21	
Barry	August 23–29	Category 1 hurricane	80 mph (130 km/h)	986 hPa (29.12 inHg)	Florida, United States Gulf Coast, Mexico	Minor	None	
Chantal	September 10–15	Category 1 hurricane	75 mph (120 km/h)	994 hPa (29.35 inHg)	Bermuda	None	None	
Dean	September 26–30	Tropical storm	65 mph (105 km/h)	999 hPa (29.50 inHg)	Mid-Atlantic, New England, North Carolina, Virginia	Minor	None	
Season aggregates
6 systems	July 23 – September 30		115 mph (185 km/h)	962 hPa (28.41 inHg)		$3 billion	21	

== See also ==
- 1983 Pacific hurricane season
- 1983 Pacific typhoon season
- 1983 North Indian Ocean cyclone season
- Australian cyclone seasons: 1982–83, 1983–84
- South Pacific cyclone seasons: 1982–83, 1983–84
- South-West Indian Ocean cyclone seasons: 1982–83, 1983–84
- South Atlantic tropical cyclone
- Mediterranean tropical-like cyclone
