= Tropical Storm Domoina =

South-West Indian tropical storm in 1984

Severe Tropical Storm Domoina
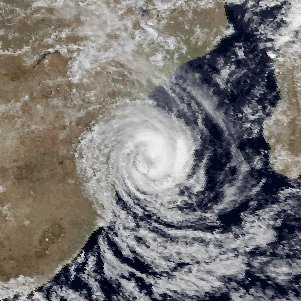
- Severe Tropical Storm Domoina close to its Mozambique landfall on January 29

Meteorological history
- Formed: January 16, 1984
- Dissipated: February 2, 1984

Severe tropical storm
- 10-minute sustained (MFR)
- Highest winds: 95 km/h (60 mph)
- Lowest pressure: 976 hPa (mbar); 28.82 inHg

Tropical storm
- 1-minute sustained (SSHWS/JTWC)
- Highest winds: 100 km/h (65 mph)

Overall effects
- Fatalities: 242
- Damage: $200 million (1984 USD)
- Areas affected: Madagascar, Mozambique, Swaziland, South Africa
- IBTrACS
- Part of the 1983–84 South-West Indian Ocean cyclone season

Severe Tropical Storm Domoina in 1984 caused 100-year floods in South Africa and record rainfall in Swaziland. The fourth named storm of the season, Domoina developed on January 16 off the northeast coast of Madagascar. With a ridge to the north, the storm tracked generally westward and later southwestward. On January 21, Domoina struck eastern Madagascar, the third storm in six weeks to affect the nation; collectively, the storms caused 242 deaths and $25 million in damage (1984 USD). (Note: All damage totals are in 1984 United States dollars.) After crossing the country, Domoina strengthened in the Mozambique Channel to peak 10-minute sustained winds of 95 km/h (60 mph). On January 28, the storm made landfall in southern Mozambique, and slowly weakened over land. Domoina crossed into Swaziland and later eastern South Africa before dissipating on February 2.

In Mozambique, Domoina dropped heavy rainfall in the capital Maputo that accounted for 40% of the annual total. Floods in the country destroyed over 50 small dams and left widespread crop damage just before the summer harvest. Later, the rains caused the worst flooding in over 20 years in Swaziland, which damaged or destroyed more than 100 bridges. Disrupted transport left areas isolated for several days. In South Africa, rainfall peaked at 950 mm (37 in), which flooded 29 river basins, notably the Pongola River which altered its course after the storm. Flooding caused the Pongolapoort Dam to reach 87% of its capacity; when waters were released to maintain the structural integrity, additional flooding occurred in Mozambique, forcing thousands to evacuate. Throughout the region, Domoina caused widespread flooding that damaged houses, roads, and crops, leaving about $199 million in damage. There were 242 deaths in southeastern Africa.

== Meteorological history ==
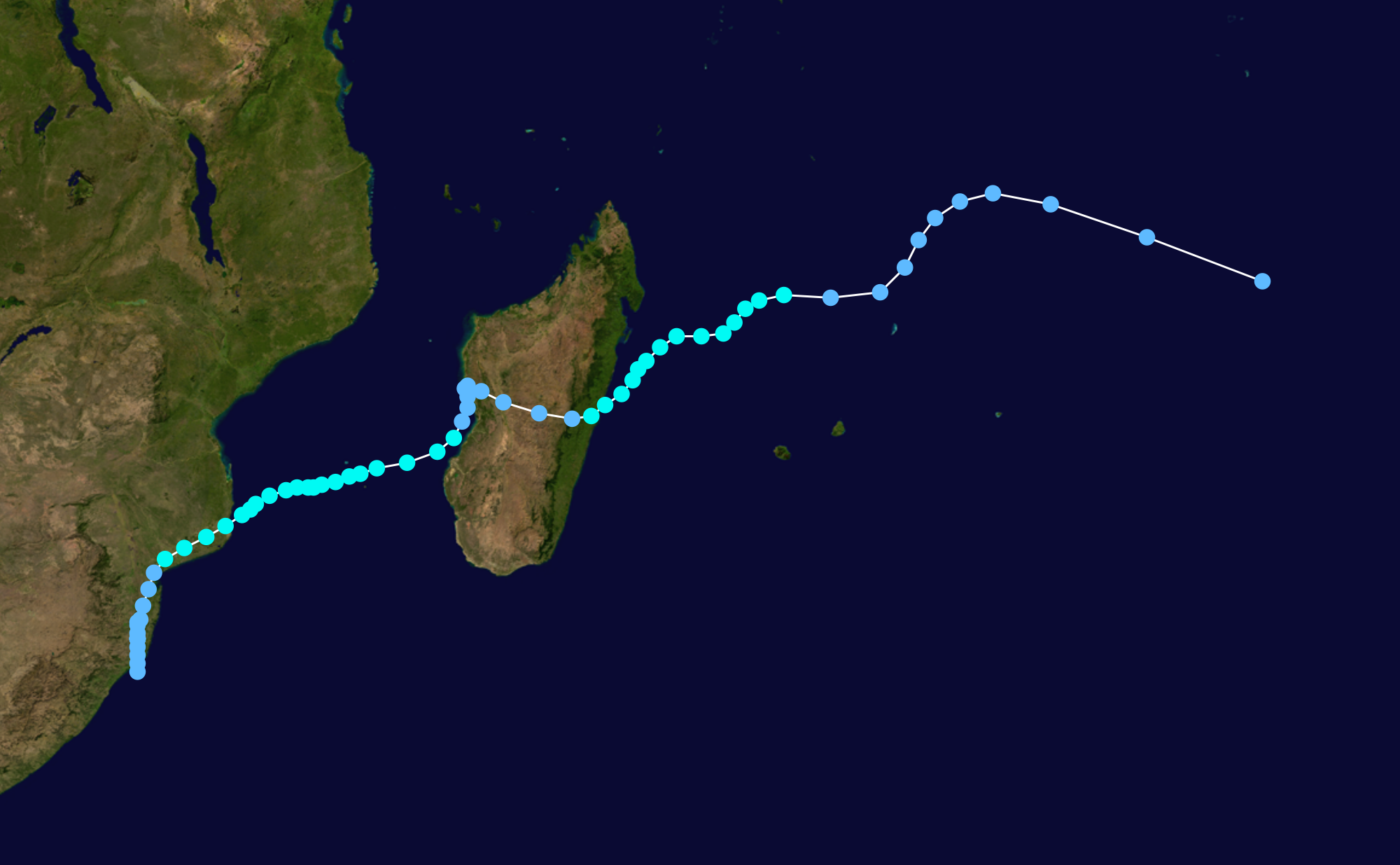
Map plotting the storm's track and intensity, according to the Saffir–Simpson scale Map key Saffir–Simpson scale Tropical depression (≤38 mph, ≤62 km/h) Tropical storm (39–73 mph, 63–118 km/h) Category 1 (74–95 mph, 119–153 km/h) Category 2 (96–110 mph, 154–177 km/h) Category 3 (111–129 mph, 178–208 km/h) Category 4 (130–156 mph, 209–251 km/h) Category 5 (≥157 mph, ≥252 km/h) Unknown Storm type Tropical cyclone Subtropical cyclone Extratropical cyclone, remnant low, tropical disturbance, or monsoon depression

In January and February 1984, conditions were favorable for tropical cyclogenesis in the southwest Indian Ocean, including warmer than normal sea surface temperatures and an active monsoon trough. On January 16, a spiral area of convection persisted off the northeast coast of Madagascar, associated with the Intertropical Convergence Zone. That day, it organized enough to warrant a satellite-based Dvorak rating of T2.5, prompting the Réunion Meteorological Service to name it Domoina. Around that time, Météo-France (MFR) (Note: The Météo-France office in Réunion is the official Regional Specialized Meteorological Center for the basin.) estimated winds of about 65 km/h (40 mph). Domoina initially tracked to the west-northwest, passing near Tromelin Island on January 18. Around that time, the storm had begun moving to the southwest, and MFR estimated that it weakened to tropical depression status. On January 19, the Joint Typhoon Warning Center (JTWC) (Note: The Joint Typhoon Warning Center is a joint United States Navy – United States Air Force task force that issues tropical cyclone warnings for the region.) began warning on Domoina, designating it Tropical Cyclone 14S. The same day, MFR again upgraded Domoina into a moderate tropical storm. On January 21, the storm made landfall just south of Tamatave in southeastern Madagascar.

While crossing Madagascar on a westward trajectory, Domonia weakened; JTWC estimated the winds decreased to 55 km/h (35 mph), after earlier estimating winds of 95 km/h (60 mph) before landfall. On January 23, the storm emerged into the Mozambique Channel near Belo, and due to a ridge to the north, it resumed its southwest motion. Domoina executed two small loops off the western coast of Madagascar while progressing generally southwestward. On January 25, MFR estimated that Domonia attained peak 10 minute sustained winds of 95 km/h (60 mph) near Europa Island; this made it a severe tropical storm. Two days later, the JTWC estimated peak 10 minute winds of 100 km/h (60 mph). Early on January 28, Domonia made a second landfall on southeastern Mozambique near peak intensity. It slowly weakened over land while moving across southern Mozambique. The JTWC discontinued advisories on January 29 when the storm was near the border of Mozambique and Swaziland. The next day, Domonia crossed into Swaziland and subsequently into eastern South Africa, weakening into a tropical depression while passing near Durban. At around that time, the system was dissipating, although MFR continued tracking Domonia until February 2, when it dissipated just offshore the east coast of South Africa.

== Impact ==
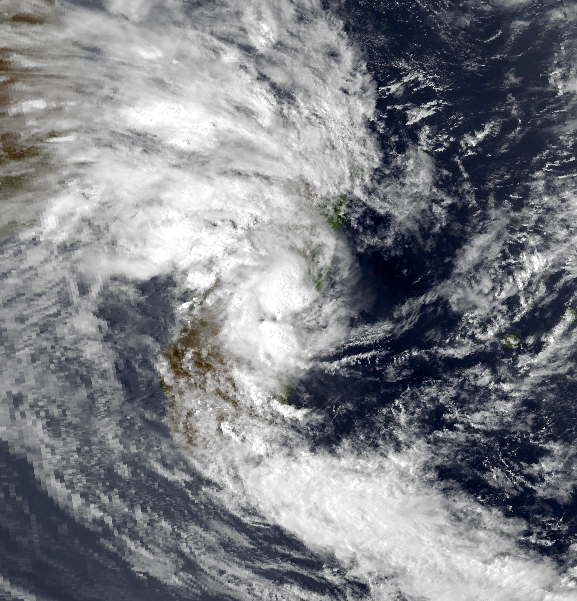
Domoina weakening over Madagascar

Throughout its path, Domoina left thousands of people homeless, and caused widespread flooding due to drawing moisture from the Indian Ocean and the Mozambique channel. The rains led to rivers bursting their banks, which isolated tens of thousands of people. In the months before Domoina struck, dry conditions persisted across southeastern Africa.

Crossing Madagascar as a moderate tropical storm, Domoina dropped rainfall along its path, reaching 98.8 mm (3.89 in) in Mahanoro on the east coast and 166.8 mm (6.57 in) in Maintirano along the west coast, both over a period of 24 hours. In the latter city, a station recorded winds of 100 km/h (62 mph). The storm caused heavy damage in Marovoay, which was later affected by Cyclone Kamisy. Domoina was the third storm to strike the country in a six-week period, after cyclones Andry and Caboto. The three storms collectively caused 42 deaths and $25 million in damage, much of it from crop damage.

As Domoina made its final landfall in Mozambique, it dropped heavy rainfall reaching 430 mm (17 in) in the town of Goba over a five-day period. Rainfall in the capital Maputo, reaching 300 mm (12 in) over two days, was about 40% of the annual total. After flooding occurred further south in South Africa, waters were released from the Pongolapoort Dam without warning. This caused many farmers to drown in southern Mozambique. Officials later advised residents along the Maputo River to evacuate to higher grounds, and thousands had to leave their houses. The storm flooded the Maputo, Umbeluzi, Incomati river basins, causing widespread power outages. The storm left the capital Maputo without clean water for several days after a pumping station was damaged, and the main harbor in the city was closed. Also in the city, the storm downed hundreds of trees, wrecked roofs, and damaged houses; about 10,000 people were left homeless nationwide. The storm damaged 28 pumping stations nationwide and destroyed over 50 small dams. Floods affected the railroad connecting Maputo to South Africa, disrupted the construction of a dam, and damaged portions of a bridge near Boane. Transport was disrupted in the northern and southern portion of the country. There was widespread crop damage in Mozambique, affecting 350,000 farmers, and flooding about 250,000 ha (620,000 acres) of fields. After an extended drought, many farmers had moved closer to river beds, making their fields more vulnerable. About 119,000 tons of fruits, vegetables, and other crops were wrecked, consisting of much of the summer crop, and about 5,000 cattle died. About 49,000 people lost everything they owned. In the country, the storm caused 109 fatalities, and damage was estimated at $75 million.

Later, the storm dropped heavy rainfall in Swaziland, reaching 906 mm (35.7 in) at Piggs Peak; there, rainfall reached 615 mm (24.2 in) in a one-day period. Described as the worst flooding in over 20 years, the precipitation increased levels along most rivers in the country, some of which rose 30 m (98 ft) in a few hours. The floods washed out or damaged over 100 bridges, and two railways had cuts in their lines. The floods closed at least 20 major roads and the country's primary airport. Most schools nationwide were also closed during the storm. There were initial difficulties in determining the extent of the damage due to cut communications and disrupted transportation. For several days, southeastern Swaziland was only accessible by air travel, while rural parts of the country lost access to fresh water. Thousands of livestock died during the storm, and thousands of acres of croplands were flooded. About 10,000 citrus trees were destroyed, and crop damage was estimated at $2.5 million. About 500 people were left homeless in the small nation, after many homes were damaged or destroyed. Schools and health clinics were also damaged. The storm's high winds knocked down trees and power lines, leaving power outages. Overall damage was estimated at $54 million, of which $47.5 million from infrastructure damage, and Domoina killed 73 people in the country.

=== South Africa ===
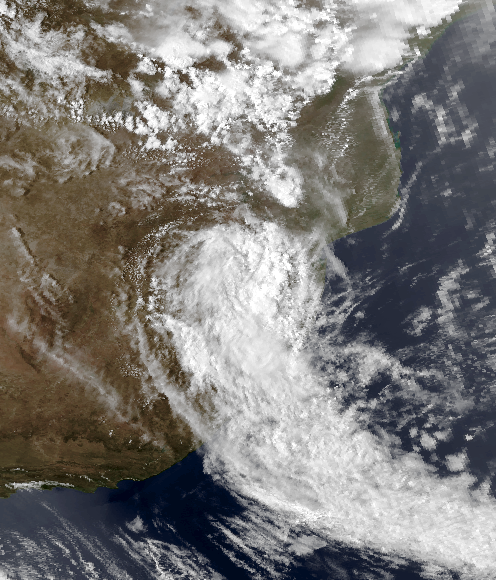
Domoina over South Africa

While Domoina was moving through South Africa, it drew an area of moisture from the northeast, which produced heavy rainfall that peaked at 950 mm (37 in) between Richards Bay and Sodwana Bay. Totals of over 700 mm (28 in) were reported along the upper Umfolozi, Mkuze, Pongola and middle Usutu and Komati rivers, and along the upper and lower Ingwavuma river. Precipitation spread as far south as Durban, but did not penetrate far into the center of the country. An area of about 107,000 km^{2} (41,000 mi^{2}) received 370 mm (15 in) of rainfall.

Along the Umfolozi River, a discharge rate of 16,000 m³/s (565,000 ft³/s) was recorded, which was three times the rate of a 100-year flood. The river avulsed, or changed its course, near where it met with the Msunduzi River. High rains in the mountains caused the largest flood to date along the Pongola River. The floodplain downstream of the Pongolapoort Dam was inundated to where the Pongola met the Ututu River, which filled many pans – dry lakes – in the region. Along 29 river locations in eastern South Africa, river heights were estimated to have been 1 in 50 year events. The river flooding moved sediment along many banks, and in one location the sediment reached 10 km (6.2 mi) in length. Due to the widespread flooding and the remoteness of the worst affected areas, there were minimal measurements on the river flow along the Pongola, although above the Pongolapoort dam, levels reached 13,000 m³/s (460,000 ft³/s), which were 18 times higher than the previous record highest. There had been a planned release of water from the Pongolapoort Dam in March 1984 to provide adequate water to the floodplain, but Domoina prevented this from occurring. The dam had its highest hydrology on January 31 and reached 87% of its capacity. Waters from the dam were released on February 2 to prevent the dam from exceeding capacity. With the future threat of Cyclone Imboa, dam levels continued to drop until returning to normal by February 16, despite requests to hold the water to prevent further crop damage.

Near the South Africa border with Swaziland, flooding stranded about 80,000 people on tribal lands. One road in the country was converted into a makeshift landing strip to allow helicopters and planes to drop off emergency supplies. A period of heavy rain flooded the Umfolozi River, which destroyed a rail bridge near Mtubatuba and a bridge crossing highway N2. The floods were so strong that they washed a boat from Lake St. Lucia to a point 16 km (9.9 mi) away. At the lake, the floods washed away a dredge and severely damaged a nearly-finished canal from the lake to the Umfolozi River. Widespread crop damage occurred along the Umfolozi river plains after being covered by up to 1 m (3.3 ft) of sediment. The South African Weather Bureau considered Domoina as the "first tropical cyclone in recent history to have caused flooding and extensive damage." Nationwide, the storm caused 60 deaths and damaged the properties of 500,000 people, causing R100 million (1984 ZAR, $70 million 1984 USD). (Note: Original source is in South African rand, converted to United States dollar.)

== Aftermath ==
In Mozambique, workers assisted people in moving to higher grounds following flooding. Members of the Mozambique Red Cross helped distribute food and clothing to the affected residents, and planes helped drop off supplies to residents in isolated areas.

On January 31, the government of Swaziland declared a state of emergency and requested assistance from the international community. South Africa provided two helicopters to the country to survey the affected areas. Various countries and United Nations agencies provided about $1.01 million in cash and supplies to Swaziland. The United Nations Department of Humanitarian Affairs provided $20,000. The European Economic Community donated about $80,000 to purchase tents and blankets. The Lutheran World Federation donated $20,000 in cash, along with generators and blankets, while World Vision International sent $10,000 in cash. Within a week, workers reopened most major roads to travel, and by February 24, most roads were reopened. Workers also quickly restored the downed power lines. Relief items were distributed by both air and road in the weeks following the storm, coordinated by the Swaziland Red Cross and assisted by volunteer organizations. In part due to Domoina as well as the previously occurring drought, the economy of Swaziland stagnated through 1985.

Following the storm in South Africa, workers restored the original course of the Umfolozi River after it had moved. Officials later purchased a new dredge to remove sediment from Lake St. Lucia, and the canal connecting the lake to the Umfolozi River was later finished. Local governments coordinated relief efforts in the country, including delivering food and providing shelter for those who lost their homes. The South African Red Cross provided food to storm victims, many of whom were beneficiaries of the food program during the extended drought. The South African government declared Natal a disaster area. The country's military provided 25 helicopters to rescue flood victims and donated 3,000 tents. The government later authorized $85 million to fund repairing damaged rails and roads. The American government donated $100,000 to the country, mostly to purchase supplies. West Germany also donated about $231,000, mostly for the feeding program.

== See also ==
- Subtropical Depression Dando – made landfall in southern Mozambique in 2012
