= Baie aux Huîtres =

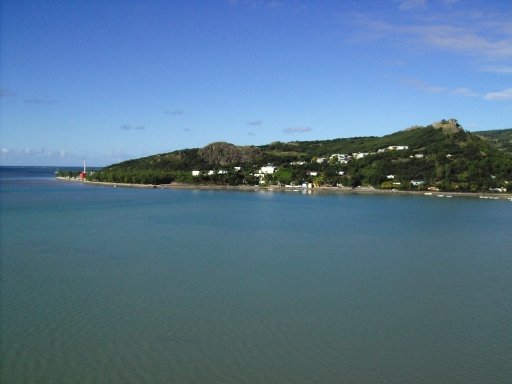
- Interactive map of Baie aux Huîtres
- Coordinates: 19°43′45″S 63°21′40″E
- Country: Mauritius
- Island: Rodrigues

Population
  - Total: 2,500
- Time zone: UTC+4 (MUT)
  - Summer (DST): UTC+5

Baie aux Huîtres is a coastal village located on the Mauritian island of Rodrigues in the Indian Ocean.

It has approximately 2,500 inhabitants, living in various neighborhoods such as Acacias, Pointe la Gueule, Allée Tamarin, La Bonté, Terre Madoff, and Grand Bois Noir.
