= Cyclone Cheneso =

South-West Indian Ocean cyclone in 2023

Tropical Cyclone Cheneso
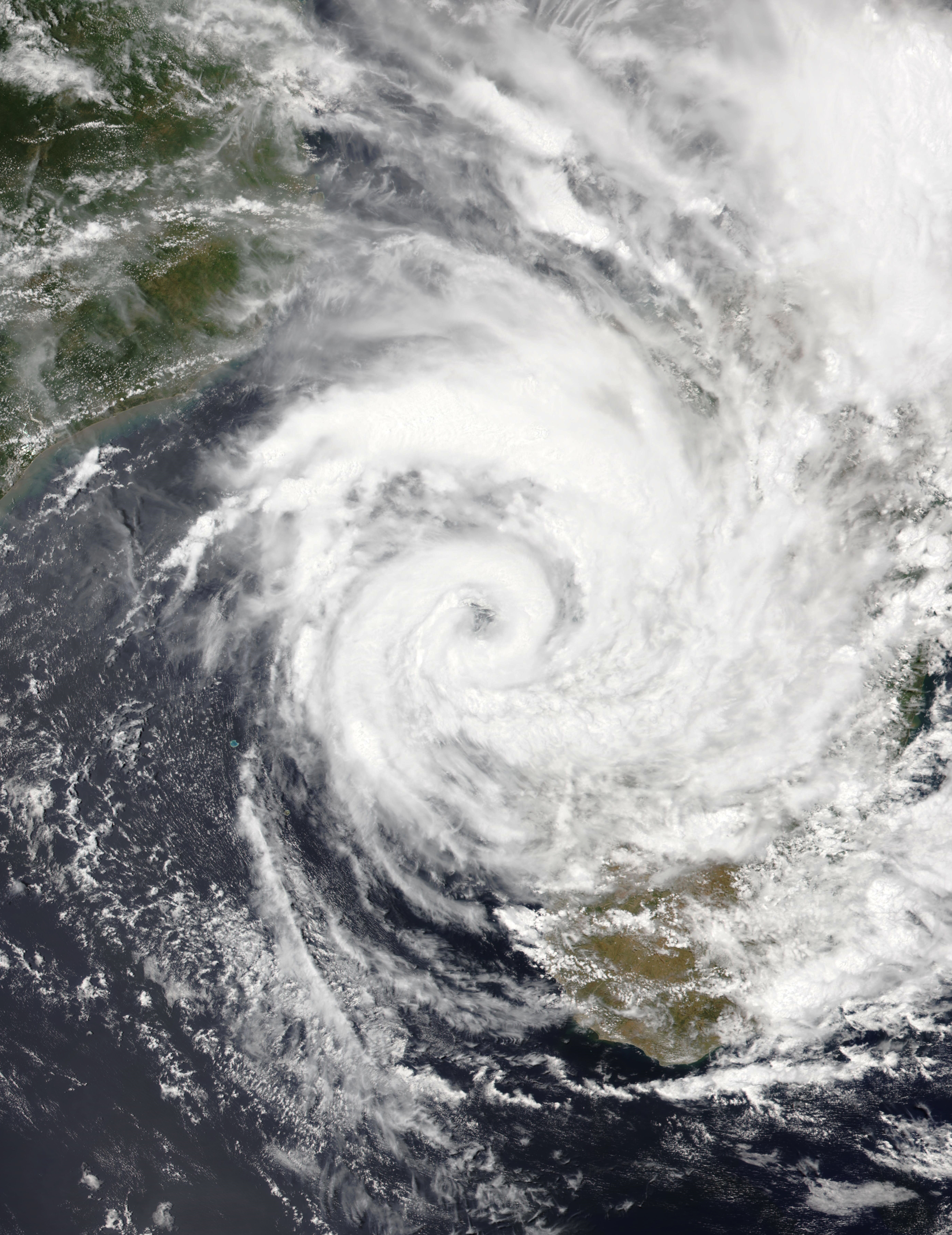
- Cyclone Cheneso strengthening off the coast of Madagascar on 25 January

Meteorological history
- Formed: 16 January 2023
- Post-tropical: 29 January 2023
- Dissipated: 1 February 2023

Tropical cyclone
- 10-minute sustained (MFR)
- Highest winds: 140 km/h (85 mph)
- Lowest pressure: 964 hPa (mbar); 28.47 inHg

Category 2-equivalent tropical cyclone
- 1-minute sustained (SSHWS/JTWC)
- Highest winds: 155 km/h (100 mph)
- Lowest pressure: 965 hPa (mbar); 28.50 inHg

Overall effects
- Fatalities: 33
- Missing: 20
- Damage: $20 million (2023 USD)
- Areas affected: Madagascar
- Part of the 2022–23 South-West Indian Ocean cyclone season

Tropical Cyclone Cheneso was a strong and deadly tropical cyclone that affected Madagascar in January 2023. The fourth tropical storm and fifth tropical cyclone of the 2022–23 South-West Indian Ocean cyclone season, Cheneso developed out of a zone of disturbed weather status which was first monitored at RSMC La Réunion on 17 January. Despite convection wrapping into the curved band pattern, the system formed into a tropical depression on 18 January. The depression strengthened into Severe Tropical Storm Cheneso on the following day. Cheneso made landfall over northern Madagascar and weakened into an inland depression, before emerging into the Mozambique Channel. Cheneso later strengthened into a tropical cyclone on 25 January. The system continued moving southeast, before transitioning into a post–tropical depression on 29 January.

The National Office for Risk and Disaster Management (BNGRC) has reported 33 deaths and 20 missing. The agency reports a total 90,870 affected people, 34,100 of which were displaced. Around 23,600 homes and 164 schools suffered damage. Humanitarians and authorities also supported post–storm preparation and relief efforts, as millions were expected to be impacted. The same areas were affected by the far more powerful Cyclone Freddy two weeks later.

== Meteorological history ==
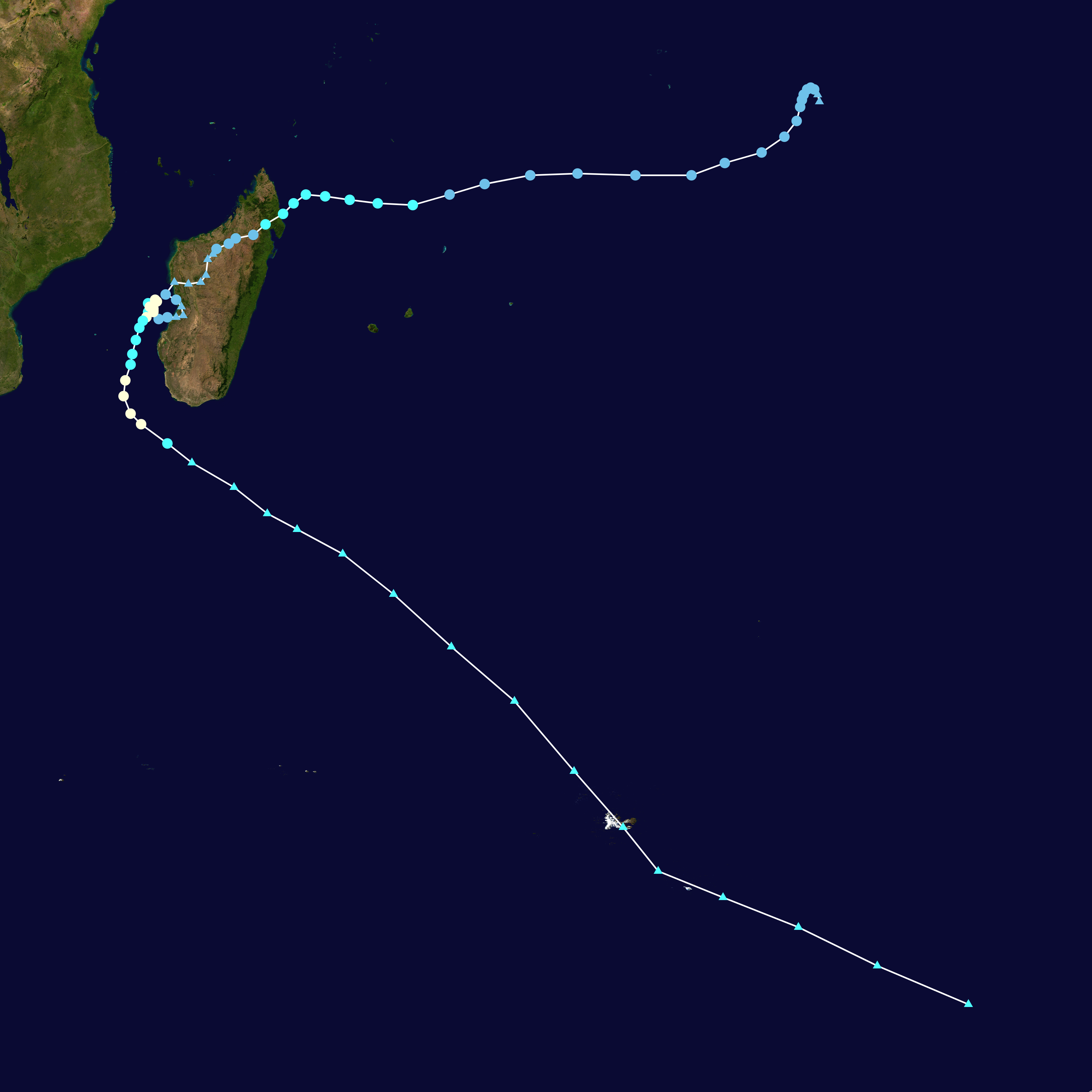
Map plotting the storm's track and intensity, according to the Saffir–Simpson scale (Note: The position of Cheneso's Category 2 peak is not depicted in this graphic as it is an asynoptic point (i.e. not at the 6-hour intervals of all other points) occurring at 03:00 UTC 28 January.) Map key Saffir–Simpson scale Tropical depression (≤38 mph, ≤62 km/h) Tropical storm (39–73 mph, 63–118 km/h) Category 1 (74–95 mph, 119–153 km/h) Category 2 (96–110 mph, 154–177 km/h) Category 3 (111–129 mph, 178–208 km/h) Category 4 (130–156 mph, 209–251 km/h) Category 5 (≥157 mph, ≥252 km/h) Unknown Storm type Tropical cyclone Subtropical cyclone Extratropical cyclone, remnant low, tropical disturbance, or monsoon depression

The origin of Cheneso can be traced back to an area of persistent showers and thunderstorms south of Diego Garcia, first noted by the Météo–France (MFR) on 10 January 2023. Three days later, the Joint Typhoon Warning Center (JTWC) had also begun monitoring the area of disturbance. The system was located in a favorable environment for intensification, as well as warm sea surface temperatures, low to high vertical wind shear. Despite this, the MFR initiated advisories for the zone of disturbed weather, while the JTWC issued a Tropical Cyclone Formation Alert (TCFA) on 17 January. Six hours later, the MFR upgraded the system to tropical disturbance status. Similarly, the JTWC subsequently initiated advisories on the system and classified it as Tropical Cyclone 08S.

Deep convection was wrapping into the curved band pattern, prompting the MFR to upgrade it to a tropical depression status. At 12:00 UTC on 18 January, the MFR also upgraded the system into a moderate tropical storm status, and the Meteo Madagascar named it Cheneso. Soon afterward, Cheneso intensified further into a severe tropical storm status. Satellite imagery showed that a central dense overcast (CDO) was obscuring the low–level circulation center (LLCC). Cheneso continued moving westwards, and by the next day, it had made landfall over northern Madagascar; the JTWC released its final warning on the storm. By 18:00 UTC, the MFR declared that Cheneso had degenerated into an overland depression. Due to uncertainty in predicting the storm's track, the MFR temporarily ceased issuing advisories on 20 January. During 21 January, Cheneso began to emerge into the Mozambique Channel, the JTWC resumed monitoring and stated the system had the potential to re–develop. The LLCC started to get consolidated with deep convective bands wrapping into it. As a result, the MFR initiated advisories again on 23 January.

Cheneso making landfall in Madagascar on 19 January

Cheneso gained tropical disturbance status yet again, however the system lacked deep convection near its center. By 14:00 UTC that day, the JTWC re–issued a TCFA, and re–upgraded the system to a tropical storm. Cheneso resumed its organizing trend soon afterward, and at 00:00 UTC on 24 January, the MFR upgraded the system to a tropical depression status. Six hours later, convection increased near the center, and the storm was upgraded to moderate tropical storm status. The storm continued to organize with an intense CDO forming along with an eye, and Cheneso strengthened to severe tropical storm status. By 03:00 UTC on 25 January, Cheneso strengthened into a Category 1–equivalent tropical cyclone on the Saffir–Simpson hurricane wind scale (SSHWS), as it neared the coast of Madagascar. The cyclone strengthened further with a defined curved pattern, marking its intensification into a tropical cyclone status. By 18:00 UTC, the eye pattern consolidated as the cyclone moved northeast after being stationary for the past 6 hours. Satellite imagery depicted that a tightly–wrapped convective banding was circulating around a cloud–filled eye. Cheneso started to rapidly weaken after its eye quickly collapsed and the cloud tops had warmed. By 12:00 UTC on 26 January, Cheneso was downgraded to severe tropical storm status by the MFR, as it headed in a southeast direction.

By the next day, Cheneso was downgraded to tropical storm status by the JTWC as its LLCC and its surrounding convection became a fragmented cold band. But, Cheneso's cloud pattern continued to improve with its CDO, and Cheneso re–intensified, reaching 10–minute maximum sustained winds of 120 km/h (75 mph), 1–minute sustained winds of 130 km/h (80 mph) around 00:00 UTC on 28 January. A Radarsat–2 SAR image recorded winds of 80–85 km/h (50–53 mph) around the swath. At 03:00 UTC on 28 January, the JTWC estimated that Cheneso had strengthened into a Category 2–equivalent tropical cyclone, with 1–minute sustained winds at 155 km/h (100 mph). Cheneso weakened into a severe tropical storm status, after the convection began to rapidly deteriorate. The JTWC also reported that Cheneso had weakened further into a tropical storm status. By 06:00 UTC on 29 January, Cheneso's structure became poorly organized, prompting MFR to reclassify the storm as a post–tropical depression. The JTWC also discontinued warnings on the system around 03:00 UTC on 30 January. The system was last noted on 1 February.

== Preparations and impact ==
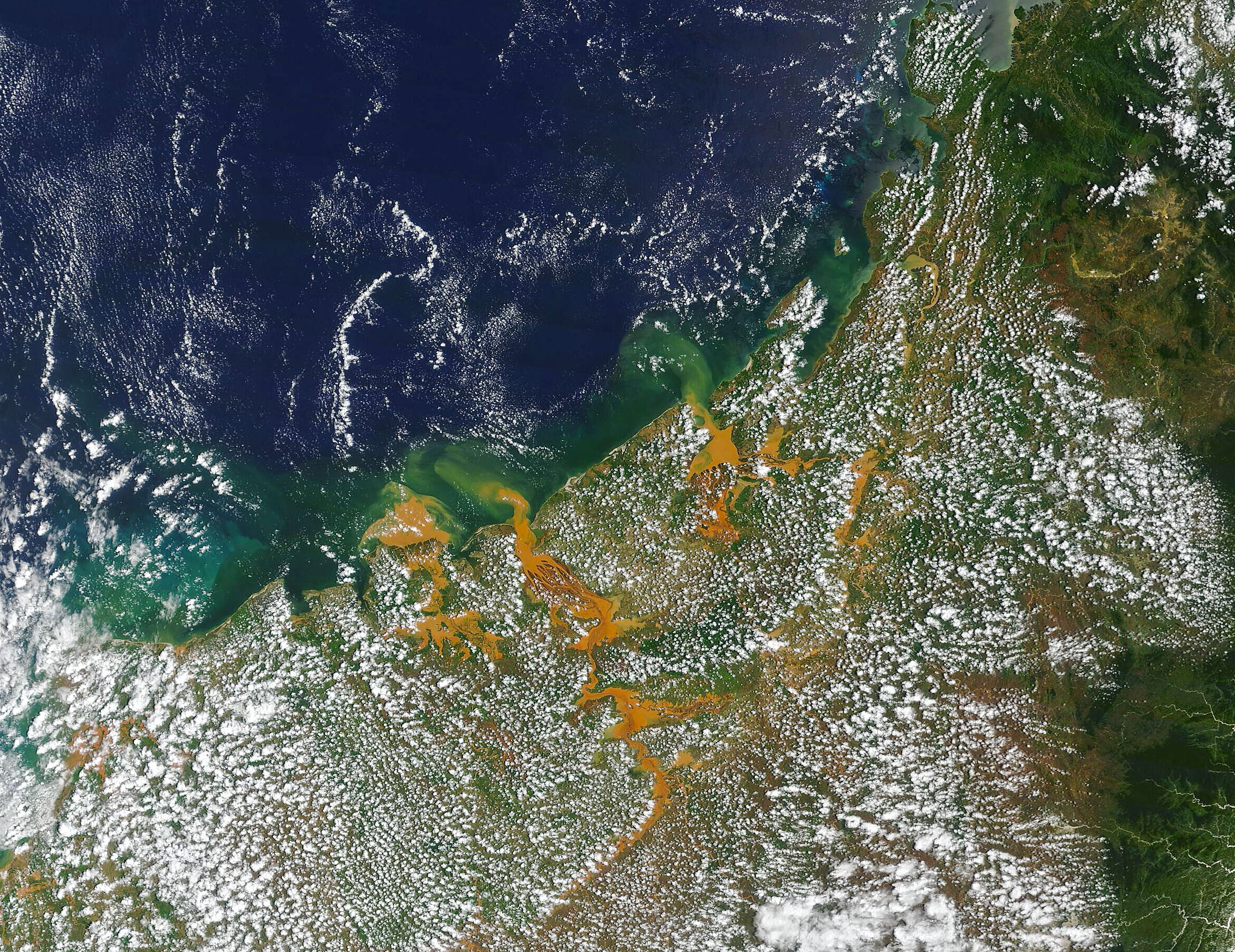
MODIS satellite imagery of flooding in Madagascar on 29 January

Upon making landfall in Madagascar, humanitarians and authorities coordinated preparedness activities. The storm was expected to affect up to 3 million people. The United Nations Humanitarian Air Service (UNHAS) were also placed on standby. Accordingly, cyclone response measures were activated by the BNGRC and humanitarian organisations. The Copernicus Emergency Management Service – Mapping were activated in order to "support damage assessment". Local authorities issued an alert of heavy rain in the country's central and western regions, posing an imminent risk of flooding and landslides.

In Sambava, Madagascar, Cheneso caused 100 mm (3.9 in) of rain. The Météo Madagascar issued a red flood watch for several river basins. The government of Madagascar ordered the temporary closure of schools. Strong winds spread from north to south along the northwestern coast of Madagascar. Several bridges were destroyed. Cheneso made landfall between the towns of Sambava and Antalaha as a severe tropical storm status on 19 January.

The BNGRC reported 90,870 affected people, 34,100 of which were displaced. At least 33 people were killed in the onslaught of Cheneso, with 20 others missing. In addition to this, over 23,600 houses, 18 medical centers and 164 schools were damaged. About 1,400 estimate of rice fields were flooded. Oman responded by sending 7 tons of medicine and 35 tons of food aid to victims of the cyclone. According to local authorities, food supplies are being provided to those in need.

== See also ==
- Cyclone Gafilo (2004)
- Cyclone Ernest (2005)
- Cyclone Ivan (2008)
- Cyclone Bingiza (2011)
- Cyclone Giovanna (2012)
- Cyclone Hellen (2013) – a powerful tropical cyclone that impacted northern Madagascar.
- Cyclone Ava (2017) – a strong tropical cyclone that brought impacts to parts of eastern Madagascar.
- Cyclone Eloise (2021) – another cyclone that struck northern Madagascar as a tropical storm and intensified to a Category 2 on the Saffir–Simpson scale in the Mozambique channel.
- Cyclone Batsirai (2022) – a powerful tropical cyclone that also impacted eastern Madagascar.
- Cyclone Freddy (2023) – also affected Madagascar a few weeks later.
- Tropical cyclones in 2023
- Weather of 2023
- Climate change in Madagascar
