= Humanitarian response to Cyclone Freddy =

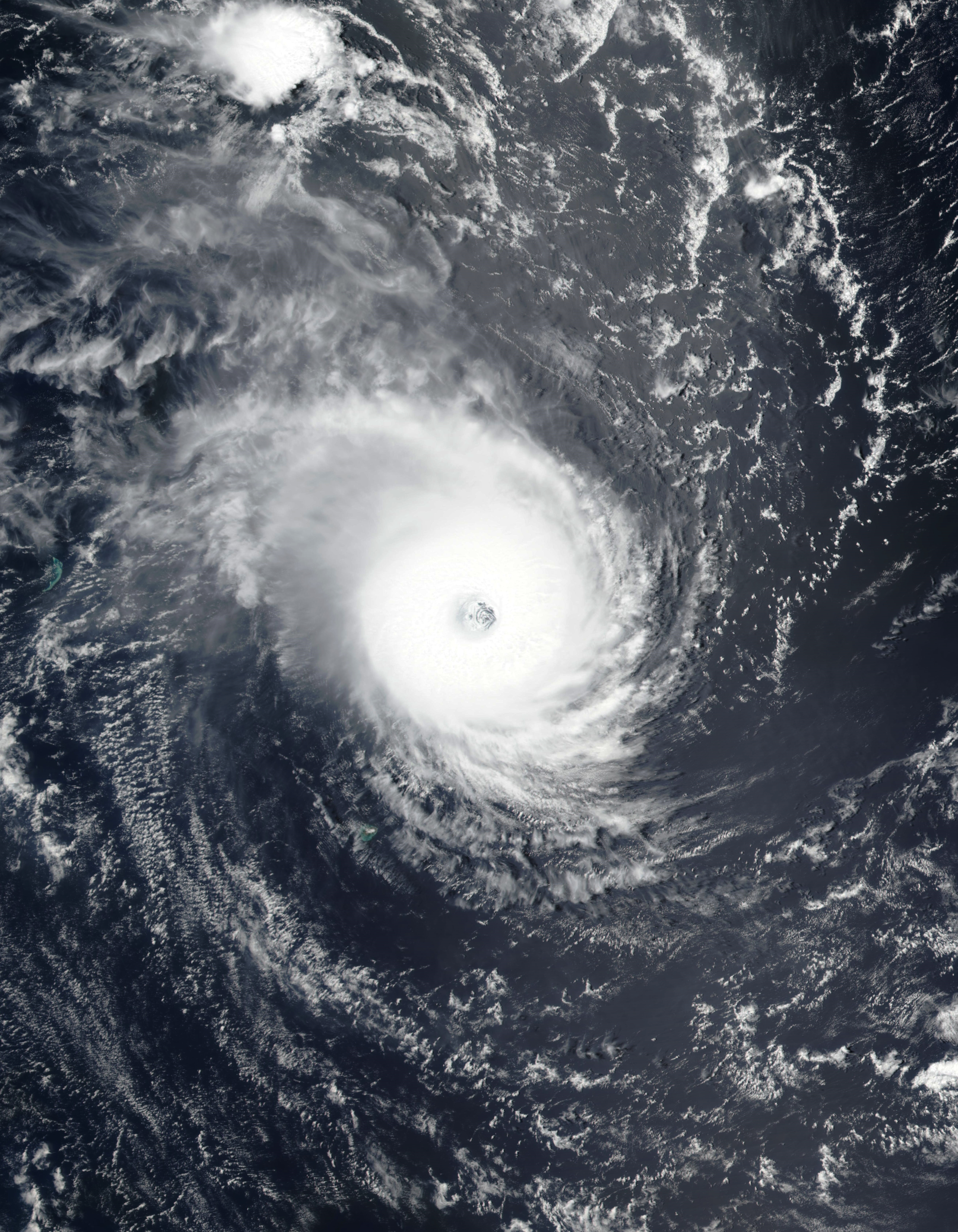
Cyclone Freddy

Many countries allocated relief aid items to southern Africa after Cyclone Freddy, with a main focus on the humanitarian crisis in Malawi. Items included hygiene supplies, food rations, and safe drinking water among other things Total donations reach the millions in USD, and there was also a primary focal point on the historic and ongoing outbreak of Cholera in the region. Several nations also expressed condolences to Malawi, Mozambique, and Madagascar. The widespread and prolonged impacts prompted extensive relief efforts from the affected nations and multiple intergovernmental agencies. UNICEF and the WFP provided relief items for those affected, as well as temporary shelters.

== Africa ==
Zambia provided several relief items and 100 metric tons of maize for relief aid. Despite also bearing the brunt of Freddy, Mozambique provided an aircraft for emergency aid to Malawi. Tanzania sent a shipment of 1,000 metric tons of flour, 6,000 blankets, 50 tents, and two helicopters for rescue operations to Malawi. Two rescue planes were also sent to Mozambique. Tanzania sent cash and goods worth $1 million (K1 billion). South Africa provided an aircraft for search-and-rescue in Malawi.

Elias Mpedi Magosi, executive secretary of Southern African Development Community, announced that $300,000 was approved for humanitarian aid to Malawi. The Diocese of Southern Malawi-Upper Shire contributed K5 million in food and non-food goods to survivors of Tropical Cyclone Freddy. The African Development Bank and the African Risk Capacity agreed to release US$1.5 million towards recovery. The funds will be distributed to the Malagasy government and the World Food Programme, which will help with the relocation of impacted people.

== Americas ==
The United States announced it would provide material for emergency shelter through the Catholic Relief Services. The government of the United States, through the United States Agency for International Development, provided three humanitarian assistance grants totaling $5,750,000 to the WFP, the International Organization for Migration, and the UNICEF to provide immediate assistance to Cyclone Freddy victims in Mozambique. The US contributes $4 million to aid in the recovery from Cyclone Freddy and cholera prevention. Canada announces $8 million in humanitarian aid.

== Eurasia ==
The Government of Japan allocated plastic sheets, tents, water purifiers, and portable jerry cans to Malawi through the Japan International Cooperation Agency. The Red Cross Society of China sent $100,000 and $50,000 to Malawi and Mozambique respectively. A hospital also donated a laparoscopy training and assessment system to Maputo. South Korea provided $200,000 in humanitarian assistance to Malawi. The Government of India has provided humanitarian assistance to the Government of Malawi in the aftermath of the devastation caused by Cyclone Freddy.

The French government has donated €500,000 (US$544,381) to the WFP to assist innovative home-grown school feeding programs in the worst-affected areas in southern Malawi's cyclone-affected districts, Chikwawa and Nsanje. Norway donated kr60,000,000 ($5,792,610) evenly between Madagascar, Mozambique, and Malawi. They also announced an additional 60 million krone for food insecurities. Ireland Minister of State at the Department of Foreign Affairs, Seán Fleming said that Ireland will provide €400,000 to those affected by Cyclone Freddy.

The United Kingdom provided a search-and-rescue team of 27 people (and 6 from an EMT group) on 17 March to Malawi. They also provided emergency shelter to 3,600 citizens, and safe drinking water to 12,750 as well. They also gave the country specialist boats. The First Minister of Scotland, Nicola Sturgeon, has pledged Malawi £400,000 in funding to help with emergency assistance efforts following Cyclone Freddy.

== Multinational organizations ==
The United Nations and humanitarian partners in Malawi are requesting $70.6 million to assist nearly 1.1 million people affected by the cyclone. The UN Humanitarian Coordinator for the nation, Martin Griffiths, released $10 million on 16 March to support cholera and emergency response aid. €200,000 ($213,810) was provided by the European Union to help support victims of the system.

The EU later allocated an additional €1.3 million to Mozambique, €700,000 to Malawi, and €500,000 to Madagascar. They also released $5.5 million to Malawi from the Central Emergency Response Fund (CERF) on 19 March. The World Bank has approved a $145 million loan to Blantyre City to improve water and sanitation. The Christian Blind Mission donated €100,000 ($107,245) to help emergency relief.

The International Federation of Red Cross and Red Crescent Societies also donated 6 million swiss francs ($6,505,680) to help bring aid to 100,00 people across 5 districts in Malawi. The WFP has been providing logistical assistance to the humanitarian community in Malawi. It sent 1,783 mt of food and relief supplies to flood-affected areas through land, rivers, and air. It also concluded that it would need over $27 million for three months to provide aid to 500,000 citizens.

== Condolences ==
Condolences to Malawi, Mozambique, and Madagascar were expressed by most countries that provided aid, as well as Brazil, China, Cuba, India, Japan, South Africa, Mozambique, Tanzania, United States, and United Kingdom. The United Nations experts express their sympathy with the people of Malawi. Pope Francis expressed his solidarity and condolences to the victims.
