= List of Category 4 Australian region severe tropical cyclones =

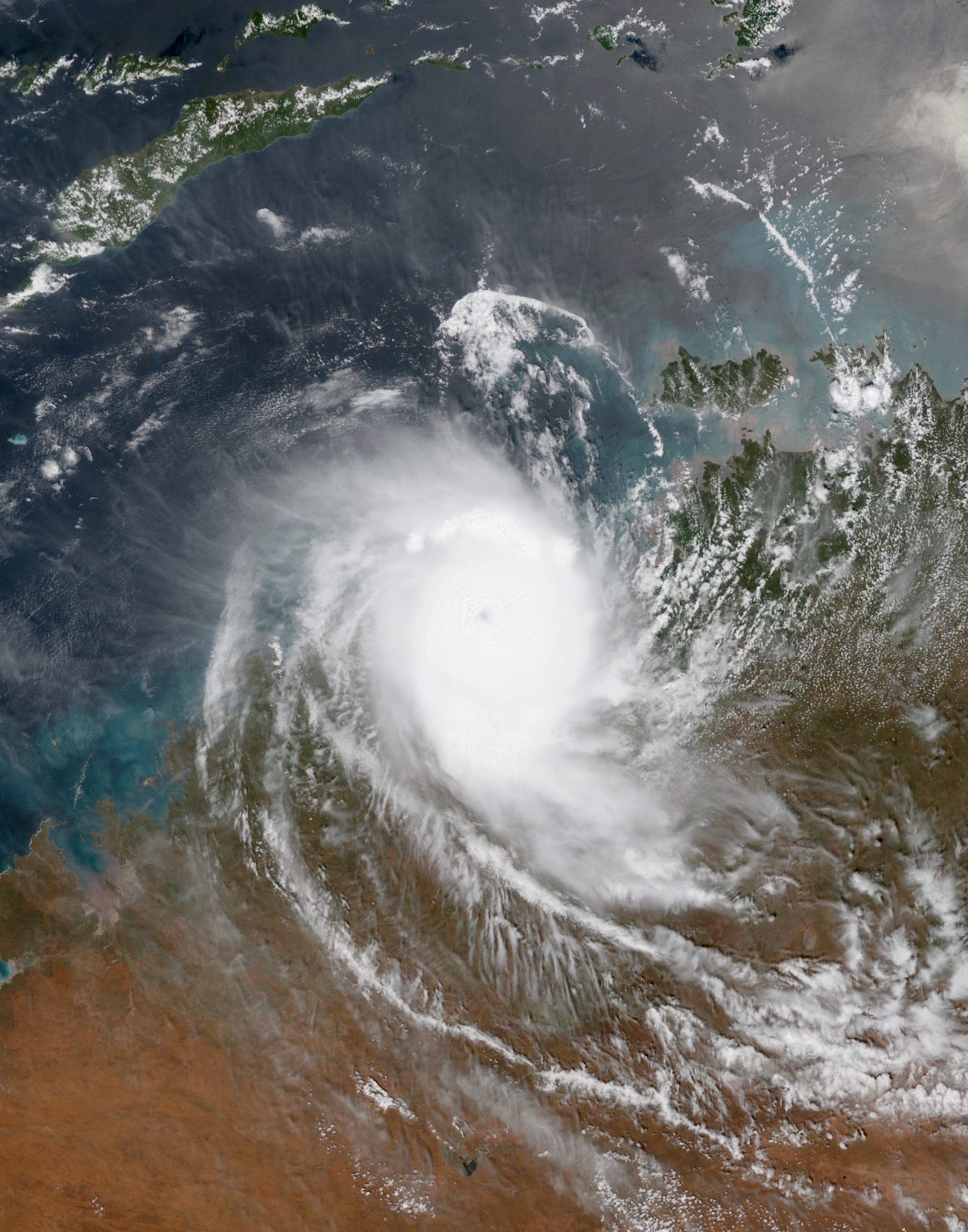
Cyclone Fina

Category 4 is the second-highest classification on the Australian tropical cyclone intensity scale which is used to classify tropical cyclones, that have 10-minute sustained winds of at least wind speeds of 86–107 knots (159–198 km/h; 99–123 mph). As of 2019 47 tropical cyclones have peaked Category 4 severe tropical cyclones in the Australian tropical cyclone basin, which is denoted as a part of the Indian and Pacific Oceans to the south of the equator and between 90°E–160°E. The earliest tropical cyclone to be classified as a Category 4 severe tropical cyclone was Gyan which was classified as a Category 4 during 22 December 1981, as it impacted New Caledonia. The latest was Pola as it passed between Fiji and Tonga. This list does include any tropical cyclones that peaked as a Category 5 severe tropical cyclone, while in the Australian region.

== Background ==
The Australian region tropical cyclone basin is located to the south of the Equator between 90°E and 160°E. The basin is officially monitored by the Australian Bureau of Meteorology as well as the Indonesian Agency for Meteorology, Climatology and Geophysics (BMKG), and the Papua New Guinea National Weather Service. The United States Joint Typhoon Warning Center (JTWC) and other national meteorological services such as New Zealand's MetService, Météo-France and the Fiji Meteorological Service, also monitor parts of the basin in an unofficial capacity. Within the basin a Category 4 severe tropical cyclone is defined as a tropical cyclone that has 10-minute mean maximum sustained wind speeds of 86–107 knots (159–198 km/h; 99–123 mph) on the Australian tropical cyclone intensity scale. A named storm can also be classified as a Category 4 tropical cyclone if it is estimated to have 1-minute mean maximum sustained wind speeds of between 113–136 knots (209–252 km/h; 130–157 mph) on the Saffir-Simpson hurricane wind scale. This scale is not officially used by any of the warning centres for the region, but tropical cyclones are compared to it by various agencies, including NASA. On both scales a Category 5 tropical cyclone is expected to cause widespread devastation if it significantly impacts land at or near its peak intensity.

== Systems ==
=== 1970s ===
Name	Duration	Peak intensity		Areas affected	Damage (USD)	Deaths	Refs
Name	Duration	Wind speed	Pressure	Areas affected	Damage (USD)	Deaths	Refs
Kerry	21–22 January 1973	165 km/h (105 mph)	960 hPa (28.35 inHg)	Western Australia			
Madge	8–18 March 1973	165 km/h (105 mph)	952 hPa (28.11 inHg)	Northern Territory, Queensland			
Pam	30 January – 8 February 1974	195 km/h (120 mph)	925 hPa (27.32 inHg)	Wallis and Futuna, Vanuatu; New Caledonia, Queensland	Significant	Unknown	
Tracy	21–26 December 1974	175 km/h (110 mph)	950 hPa (28.05 inHg)	Northern Territory			
Vanessa (1976)	January 1976	175 km/h (110 mph)	950 hPa (28.05 inHg)	Western Australia			
Watorea		165 km/h (105 mph)	970 hPa (28.64 inHg)				
Ted	15–21 December 1976	185 km/h (115 mph)	945 hPa (27.91 inHg)	Queensland			
Leo (1977)							
Trudy (1978)							
Winnie (1978)							
Kerry (1979)							
Hazel (1979)							
Idylle (1979)							

=== 1980s ===
Name	Duration	Peak intensity		Areas affected	Damage (USD)	Deaths	Refs
Name	Duration	Wind speed	Pressure	Areas affected	Damage (USD)	Deaths	Refs
Brian (1980)							
Fred (1980)							
Simon	21–28 February 1980	165 km/h (105 mph)	950 hPa (28.05 inHg)	Queensland, New Zealand	Minor	None	
Doris–Gloria (1980)							
Alice–Adelaide (1980)							
Felix (1980)							
Neil (1981)							
Olga (1981)							
Chris-Damia (1982)							
Bernie (1982)							
Jane	2–11 January 1983	165 km/h (105 mph)	947 hPa (27.96 inHg)	Western Australia	None	None	
Elinor	10 February – 3 March 1983	165 km/h (105 mph)	935 hPa (27.61 inHg)	Queensland	Minor	None	
Quenton (1983)							
Bobby (1984)							
Chloe (1984)							
Daryl (1984)							
Odette	16–20 January 1985	185 km/h (115 mph)	930 hPa (27.46 inHg)	Cape York Peninsula, Vanuatu			
Sandy	20–24 March 1985	195 km/h (120 mph)	953 hPa (28.14 inHg)	Northern Territory, Western Australia	N/A	None	
Victor (1986)							
Billy–Lila	5–12 May 1986	170 km/h (105 mph)	950 hPa (28.05 inHg)	Western Australia	None	None	
Elsie	22–27 February 1987	185 km/h (115 mph)	940 hPa (27.76 inHg)	Western Australia	N/A	None	
Gwenda-Ezenina (1988)							
Ned	25 March – 1 April 1989	185 km/h (115 mph)	941 hPa (27.79 inHg)	Western Australia	Minor	None	

=== 1990s ===
Name	Duration	Peak intensity		Areas affected	Damage (USD)	Deaths	Refs
Name	Duration	Wind speed	Pressure	Areas affected	Damage (USD)	Deaths	Refs
Ivor	15–26 March 1990	165 km/h (105 mph)	965 hPa (28.50 inHg)	Cape York Peninsula			
Joy	15–27 December 1990	165 km/h (105 mph)	940 hPa (27.76 inHg)	Solomon Islands, Queensland			
Errol (1991)							
Marian (1991)							
Betsy		165 km/h (105 mph)	950 hPa (28.05 inHg)	Solomon Islands, Vanuatu, New Caledonia, New Zealand	Unknown	Unknown	
Harriet-Heather (1992)							
Ian	27 February – 3 March 1992	195 km/h (120 mph)	930 hPa (27.46 inHg)	Western Australia			
Esau	24 February – 7 March 1992	195 km/h (120 mph)	925 hPa (27.32 inHg)	Vanuatu	Minimal	1	
Jane-Irna (1992)							
Nina	21 December 1992 – 5 January 1993	150 km/h (90 mph)	970 hPa (28.64 inHg)	Queensland, Tonga, Papua New Guinea, Solomon Islands, Wallis and Futuna	$1 million	32	
Oliver	5–14 February 1993	185 km/h (115 mph)	950 hPa (28.05 inHg)	Queensland			
Sharon	12–22 March 1994	195 km/h (120 mph)	930 hPa (27.46 inHg)	Indonesia, Western Australia			
Annette	12–20 December 1994	195 km/h (120 mph)	925 hPa (27.32 inHg)	Western Australia, South Australia			

=== 21st Century ===
Name	Duration	Peak intensity		Areas affected	Damage (USD)	Deaths	Refs
Name	Duration	Wind speed	Pressure	Areas affected	Damage (USD)	Deaths	Refs
Bobby	19 – 27 February 1995	195 km/h (120 mph)	925 hPa (27.32 inHg)	Northern Territory, Western Australia		8	
Agnes	16 – 22 April 1995	185 km/h (115 mph)	945 hPa (27.91 inHg)	None	None	None	
Frank	6 – 13 December 1995	175 km/h (110 mph)	950 hPa (28.05 inHg)	Western Australia	Minor	None	
Barry	4 – 7 January 1996	185 km/h (115 mph)	950 hPa (28.05 inHg)	Queensland		None	
Kirsty	7 – 14 March 1996	185 km/h (115 mph)	935 hPa (27.61 inHg)	Western Australia		None	
Olivia	5 – 12 April 1996	195 km/h (120 mph)	925 hPa (27.32 inHg)	Western Australia, South Australia			
Drena	1997	165 km/h (105 mph)	945 hPa (27.91 inHg)				
Rhonda	11 – 17 May 1997	175 km/h (110 mph)	935 hPa (27.61 inHg)	Cocos Islands, Western Australia			
Katrina	1 – 25 January 1998	165 km/h (105 mph)	940 hPa (27.76 inHg)	Solomon Islands, Vanuatu, Queensland			
Tiffany (1998)							
Elaine	16 – 20 March 1999	165 km/h (105 mph)	945 hPa (27.91 inHg)	Western Australia			
Frederic–Evrina	25 March – 1 April 1999	195 km/h (120 mph)	920 hPa (27.17 inHg)	None	None	None	
Norman	29 February – 10 March, 2000	185 km/h (115 mph)	930 hPa (27.46 inHg)	Western Australia	None	None	
Fiona	3 – 13 February, 2003	175 km/h (110 mph)	935 hPa (27.61 inHg)	None	None	None	
Monty	25 February – 3 March 2004	185 km/h (115 mph)	935 hPa (27.61 inHg)	Western Australia	Minimal	None	
Oscar-Itseng	21 – 27 March, 2004	165 km/h (105 mph)	940 hPa (27.76 inHg)	None	None	None	
Bertie–Alvin	19 – 24 November, 2005	185 km/h (115 mph)	928 hPa (27.40 inHg)	None	None	None	
Larry	15 – 20 March 2006	185 km/h (115 mph)	935 hPa (27.61 inHg)	Queensland	$1.1 billion	1	
Floyd	18 – 27 March, 2006	195 km/h (120 mph)	916 hPa (27.05 inHg)	Pilbara Coast	None	None	
Kara	23 – 30 March, 2007	185 km/h (115 mph)	926 hPa (27.34 inHg)	Western Australia	None	None	
Pancho	25 – 29 March, 2008	165 km/h (105 mph)	938 hPa (27.70 inHg)	Christmas Island, Western Australia	None	None	
Billy	15 December 2008 – 5 January 2009	175 km/h (110 mph)	950 hPa (28.05 inHg)	Western Australia	None	1	
Ilsa	12 – 27 March, 2009	165 km/h (105 mph)	958 hPa (28.29 inHg)	None	None	None	
Ului	14 – 21 March 2010	195 km/h (120 mph)	939 hPa (27.73 inHg)	Vanuatu, Solomon Islands, Queensland	Unknown	Unknown	
Zelia	12 – 18 January 2011	185 km/h (115 mph)	943 hPa (27.85 inHg)	None	None	None	
Bianca	21–30 January 2011	175 km/h (110 mph)	949 hPa (28.02 inHg)	Western Australia	None	None	
Narelle	5–15 January 2013	195 km/h (120 mph)	930 hPa (27.46 inHg)	Western Australia	None	None	
Rusty	21 February – 1 March 2013	165 km/h (105 mph)	944 hPa (27.88 inHg)	Western Australia	Unknown	Unknown	
Christine	25 December 2013 – 1 January 2014	165 km/h (105 mph)	948 hPa (27.99 inHg)	Western Australia	Unknown	Unknown	
Lam	14–20 February 2015	185 km/h (115 mph)	943 hPa (27.85 inHg)	Northern Australia	Unknown	Unknown	
Nathan	4–8 April 2015	165 km/h (105 mph)	963 hPa (28.44 inHg)	Northern Australia	Unknown	Unknown	
Ikola	4–8 April 2015	175 km/h (110 mph)	953 hPa (28.14 inHg)	None	None	None	
Quang	27 April – 1 May 2015	185 km/h (115 mph)	950 hPa (28.05 inHg)	Western Australia	Minor	None	
Debbie	23 March – 7 April 2017	175 km/h (110 mph)	949 hPa (28.02 inHg)	Queensland, New South Wales	>$1 billion	None	
Savannah	8–17 March 2019	175 km/h (110 mph)	953 hPa (28.14 inHg)	Cocos Islands	Minor	None	
Trevor	11–26 March 2019	175 km/h (110 mph)	950 hPa (28.05 inHg)	Papua New Guinea, Queensland, Northern Territory	Unknown	Unknown	
Ferdinand	22 February – 1 March 2020	175 km/h (110 mph)	951 hPa (28.08 inHg)	None	None	None	
Marian	21 February – 9 March 2021	155 km/h (100 mph)	955 hPa (28.20 inHg)	Cocos Island	None	None	
Vernon	22 February – 3 March 2022	185 km/h (115 mph)	948 hPa (27.99 inHg)	None	None	None	
Charlotte	16 – 24 March 2022	165 km/h (105 mph)	956 hPa (28.23 inHg)	Timor-Leste, Western Australia	None	None	
Freddy	4 – 14 February 2023	175 km/h (110 mph)	951 hPa (28.08 inHg)	None	None	None	
Neville	7 – 25 March 2024	185 km/h (115 mph)	948 hPa (27.99 inHg)	Cocos Islands, Christmas Island	Minor	None	
Megan	13 – 21 March 2024	165 km/h (105 mph)	950 hPa (28.05 inHg)	Queensland, Northern Territory		None	
Sean	17 – 23 January 2025	175 km/h (110 mph)	945 hPa (27.91 inHg)	None			
Bianca	18 – 27 February 2025	165 km/h (105 mph)	958 hPa (28.29 inHg)	None			
Alfred	21 February – 9 March 2025	165 km/h (105 mph)	951 hPa (28.08 inHg)	Queensland, New South Wales	>$1.18 billion	1	
Fina	14 November – 25 2025	195 km/h (120 mph)	943 hPa (27.85 inHg)	None	Unknown		
Bakung	9 - 18 December 2025	165 km/h (105 mph)	957 hPa (28.26 inHg)	Indonesia	Unknown		

== Other systems ==
- Chris–Damia – Cat 4 in SWIO.
- Walter–Gregoara – Cat 4 in SWIO.
- Harriet–Heather – Cat 4 in SWIO.
- Uriah – Cat 4 in SWIO.

Over the years, the intensity estimates of tropical cyclones have been reanalysed for various reasons and were found to have been underestimated by the various warning centres. In particular, during a database repair project that took place between 2005 and 2007, the BoM discovered that Severe Tropical Cyclone Pam of 1974, had been reanalysed at some point after 1979. This reanalysis showed that Pam had moved out of the South Pacific region and into the Australian region, as a category 5 severe tropical cyclone. However, a later reanalysis by the BoM during 2021 downgraded it to a category 4 severe tropical cyclone, as it was thought that the width of the southern eyewall was too narrow for a category 5 severe tropical cyclone.

== See also ==
- List of Category 4 Atlantic hurricanes
- List of Category 4 Pacific hurricanes
