= Tropical Storm Ana (2022) =

South-West Indian Ocean tropical storm

Severe Tropical Storm Ana
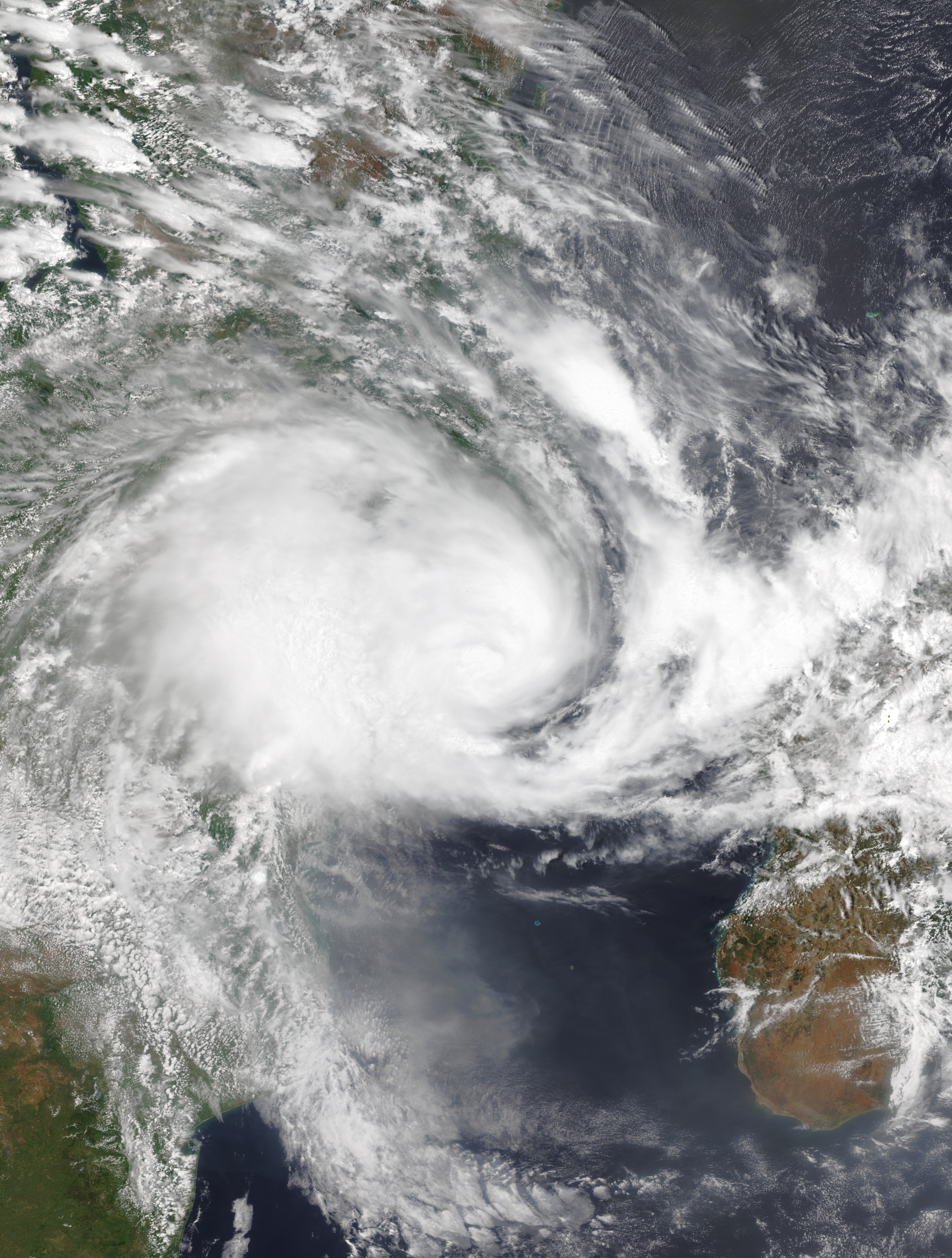
- Moderate Tropical Storm Ana shortly after landfall in Mozambique on 24 January

Meteorological history
- Formed: 20 January 2022
- Dissipated: 26 January 2022

Severe tropical storm
- 10-minute sustained (MFR)
- Highest winds: 95 km/h (60 mph)
- Lowest pressure: 987 hPa (mbar); 29.15 inHg

Tropical storm
- 1-minute sustained (SSHWS/JTWC)
- Highest winds: 95 km/h (60 mph)
- Lowest pressure: 993 hPa (mbar); 29.32 inHg

Overall effects
- Fatalities: 142
- Damage: $27 million (2022 USD)
- Areas affected: Madagascar, Mozambique, South Africa, Malawi, Zimbabwe, Mauritius, Zambia
- Part of the 2021–22 South-West Indian Ocean cyclone season

Severe Tropical Storm Ana was a deadly tropical cyclone that affected the African nations of Madagascar, Malawi and Mozambique and was the fourth-deadliest tropical cyclone in 2022, after the Western Pacific Tropical Storm Megi and Tropical Storm Nalgae, and Atlantic Hurricane Ian. The first named storm of the 2021–22 South-West Indian Ocean cyclone season, Ana developed from an area of convection that was designated as Invest 93S northeast of Madagascar.

== Meteorological history ==
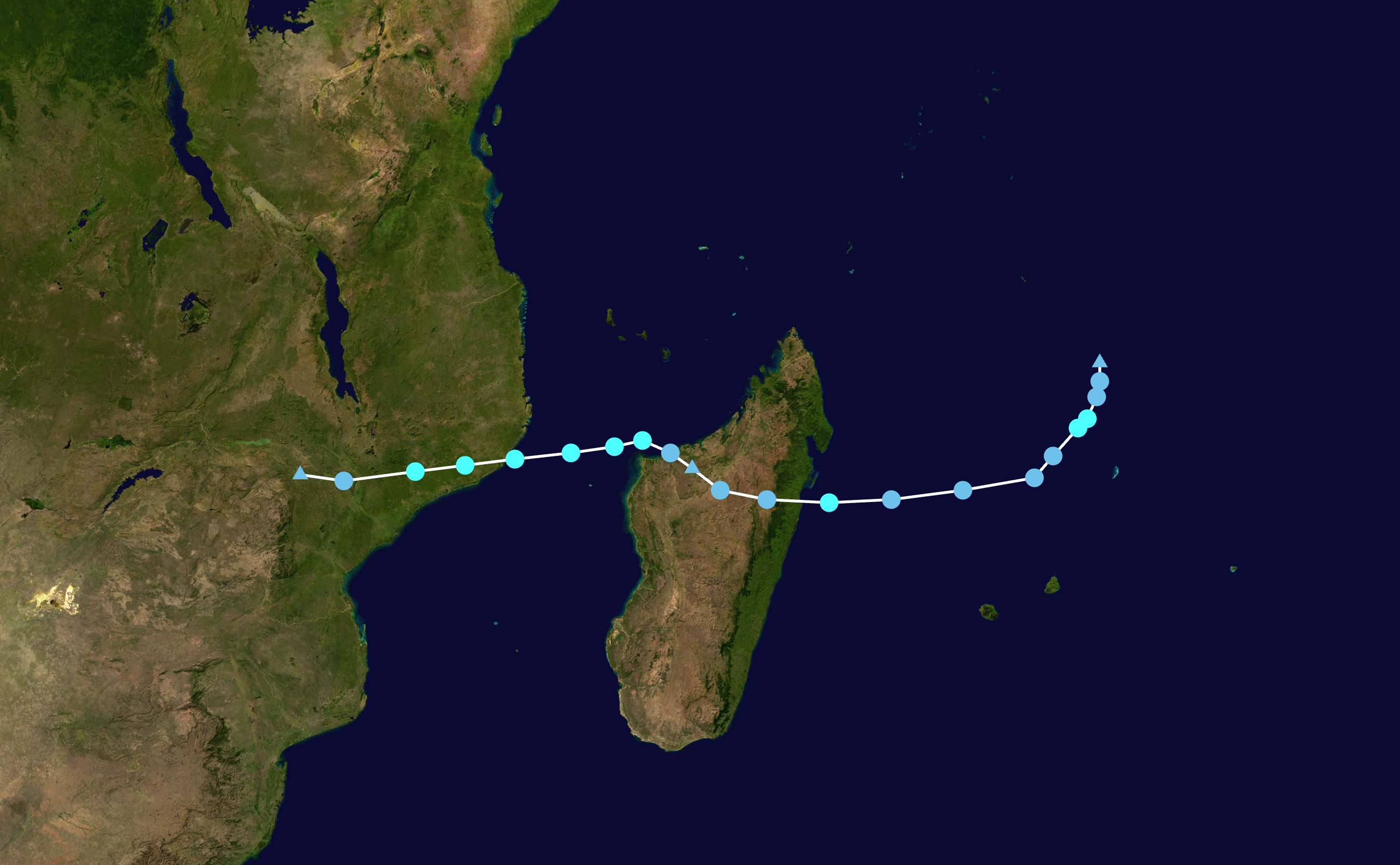
Map plotting the storm's track and intensity, according to the Saffir–Simpson scale Map key Saffir–Simpson scale Tropical depression (≤38 mph, ≤62 km/h) Tropical storm (39–73 mph, 63–118 km/h) Category 1 (74–95 mph, 119–153 km/h) Category 2 (96–110 mph, 154–177 km/h) Category 3 (111–129 mph, 178–208 km/h) Category 4 (130–156 mph, 209–251 km/h) Category 5 (≥157 mph, ≥252 km/h) Unknown Storm type Tropical cyclone Subtropical cyclone Extratropical cyclone, remnant low, tropical disturbance, or monsoon depression

As early as 14 January, long-range ensemble forecast guidance from the Global Forecast System and the European Centre for Medium-Range Weather Forecasts began to suggest a formation of a tropical cyclone to the northeast of the Mascarene Islands. At 07:30 UTC on 20 January, the Joint Typhoon Warning Center reported a formation of an area of convection, which they designated as Invest 93S, approximately 378 nmi (700 km; 435 mi) from Mauritius, with the agency giving a low chance for potential tropical cyclogenesis within the next 24 hours. At midday, the Météo-France La Réunion (MFR) noted that a closed circulation was now present to the north-northwest of Saint-Brandon. The formation of the disturbance was caused by the surge of monsoonal flow. By the evening, the JTWC upgraded the system to a medium chance for potential tropical cyclogenesis, after noticing its obscure low-level circulation (LLC). Early the next day, at 02:00 UTC, the JTWC issued its Tropical Cyclone Formation Alert (TCFA) for Invest 93S and also upgraded the system to a high chance for potential tropical cyclogenesis, as the agency noted its consolidation of a well-defined low-level center. Later at 12:00 UTC, the MFR declared the tropical low pressure system as a zone of disturbed weather, becoming the first system of the season. The department noted the elongated circulation, which was a little more compact than yesterday, but still rather poorly organized. Twelve hours later, the MFR upgraded it to tropical disturbance status, as they found that the system's cloud pattern had improved. Furthermore, its center had become well-defined but was still overall ill-defined and elongated. The disturbance slowly consolidated into a defined convective structure while also developing distinct curved rainbands, which prompted the MFR to upgrade it to a tropical depression by 06:00 UTC on 22 January.

Between 08:00 UTC and 09:00 UTC, the system's center crossed between Toamasina and Île Sainte-Marie as a tropical depression, with the MFR re-classifying the system as an overland depression. Because of the mountainous terrain of Madagascar, the system weakened a bit but still managed to preserve its organized convection and its low-level center. At 06:00 UTC the next day, the MFR re-classified it again as a tropical disturbance after entering the Mozambique Channel. Six hours later, it re-intensified into a tropical depression, as it gradually improved its convective structure and cooling of its convective bands. Its low-level clouds had developed a distinct curved pattern near the center. This occurred after entering the Mozambique Channel, where more conductive environmental conditions were available along with good convergence of monsoonal flow. At 15:00 UTC, the JTWC declared the system a tropical cyclone and designated it 07S. The MFR later upgraded it to a moderate tropical storm and named it Ana, becoming the first named storm of the season. Ana maintained its intensity until at 08:00 UTC the same day, when it made landfall near south of Angoche, Mozambique. The system later moved westwards as an overland depression, crossing across southern Malawi and northern Zimbabwe, and by midday of 25 January, it became a remnant low over the adjoining areas of Zimbabwe and Zambia. The remnant later moved towards Angola and was last noted on 30 January around Namibia and Angola.

== Impact ==
The storm caused dozens of casualties in Madagascar, Malawi and Mozambique, while causing severe damage to infrastructure in Malawi. It was feared that Cyclone Batsirai – which made landfall in Madagascar on 6 February – would hinder relief work.

=== Madagascar ===
Before becoming a moderate tropical storm, Ana made landfall as a tropical depression in Madagascar, causing heavy rainfall which led to deadly landslides and floods; it caused 58 fatalities in the country. An estimated 55,000 people had become homeless and 130,000 were forced to flee to temporary habitation centres.

=== Malawi ===
The region around Mulanje in Southern Malawi was particularly affected. 37 were reported dead with another 22 remaining missing as of 31 January. 158 people were injured. Most of the country lost electricity, and 200,000 had to leave their homes. 109,359 people were forced to reside in emergency camps. Floods damaged the Kapichira Hydroelectric Power Station, which provides 30% of the country's electricity. The nationwide electricity supply remained intermittent days after the storm passed.

=== Mozambique ===
The storm also killed 20 people in Mozambique. 10,000 houses in Mozambique were destroyed as a result of the storm. An additional 20,000 were affected by the cyclone.

== See also ==
- Weather of 2022
- Tropical cyclones in 2022
- Tropical Storm Dumako (2022) – another tropical storm which affected the same countries a month after Ana.
