= Cyclone Freddy =

Australian and South-West Indian cyclone in 2023

Very Intense Tropical Cyclone Freddy
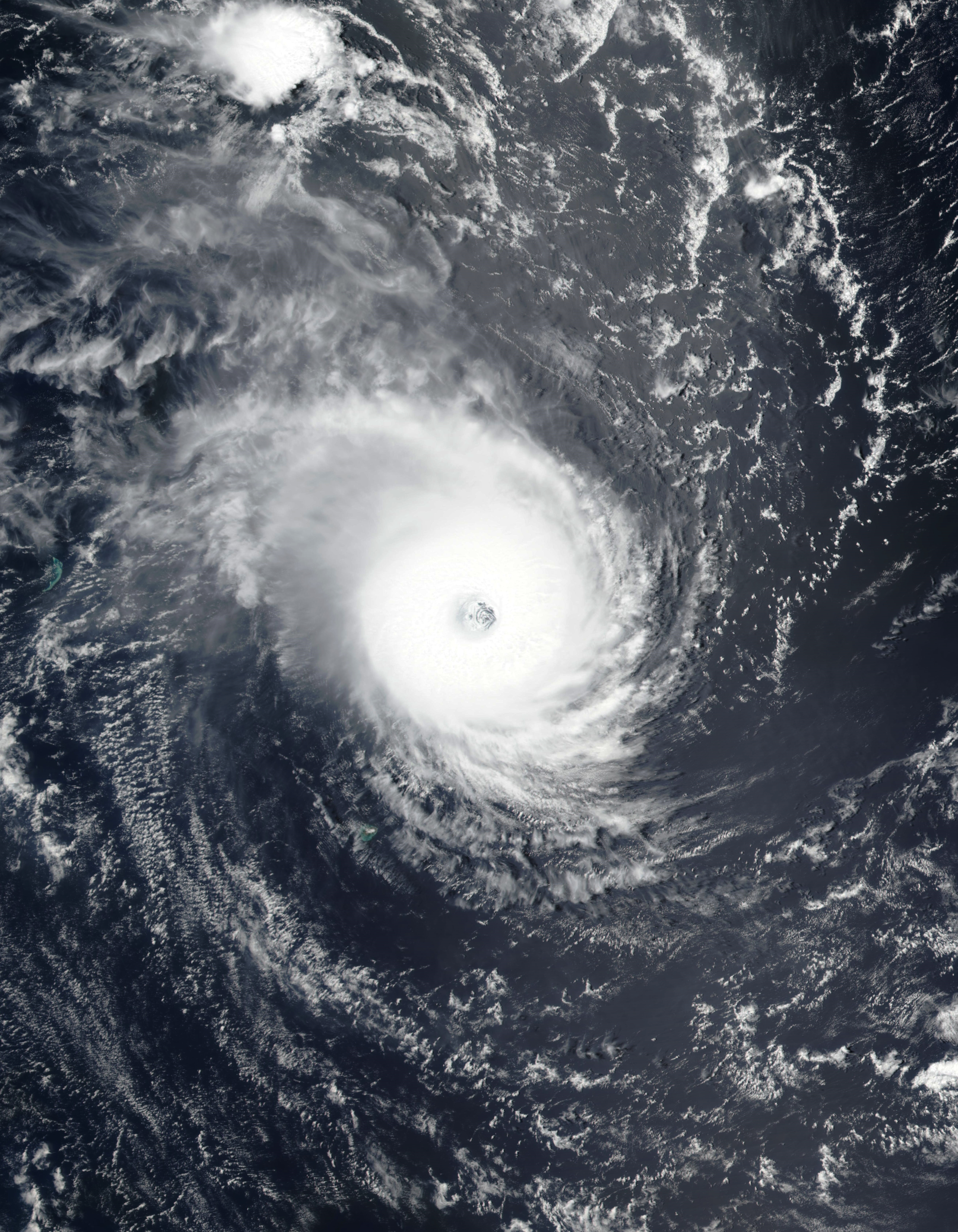
- Cyclone Freddy at its peak intensity while northeast of Rodrigues on 19 February

Meteorological history
- Formed: 4 February 2023
- Dissipated: 14 March 2023
- Duration: 5 weeks and 3 days (Longest-lasting tropical cyclone on record)

Very intense tropical cyclone
- 10-minute sustained (MFR)
- Highest winds: 230 km/h (145 mph)
- Lowest pressure: 927 hPa (mbar); 27.37 inHg

Category 5-equivalent tropical cyclone
- 1-minute sustained (SSHWS/JTWC)
- Highest winds: 260 km/h (160 mph)
- Lowest pressure: 923 hPa (mbar); 27.26 inHg

Overall effects
- Fatalities: 1,434 (Second-deadliest tropical cyclone in the South-West Indian Ocean, third-deadliest in the Southern Hemisphere)
- Injuries: 2,004
- Missing: 19
- Damage: $1.53 billion (2023 USD) (Fourth-costliest cyclone in the South-West Indian Ocean basin)
- Areas affected: Mascarene Islands; Madagascar; Mozambique; Zimbabwe; Malawi; South Africa; Eswatini; Zambia
- IBTrACS
- Part of the 2022–23 Australian region and South-West Indian Ocean cyclone seasons
- History • Meteorological history Response • Humanitarian response Other wikis • Commons: Freddy images

Very Intense Tropical Cyclone Freddy, also known as Severe Tropical Cyclone Freddy, was an exceptionally long-lived, powerful, and deadly tropical cyclone that traversed the southern Indian Ocean for more than five weeks in February and March 2023. Freddy was the longest-lasting tropical cyclone ever recorded worldwide and produced the second-highest accumulated cyclone energy—a metric used to measure the total energy generated by tropical cyclones—of any individual cyclone on record globally. Additionally, it is the third-deadliest tropical cyclone recorded in the Southern Hemisphere, only behind 2019's Cyclone Idai and the 1973 Flores cyclone.

Freddy originated from a tropical low that was located south of the Indonesian archipelago on 4 February 2023. As it traveled westward across the Indian Ocean, the storm quickly intensified, becoming a Category 4 severe tropical cyclone on the Australian scale. Freddy moved into the South-West Indian Ocean, where it reached its peak intensity with 10-minute sustained winds of 230 km/h (145 mph) and a central atmospheric pressure of 927 hPa (27.37 inHg), making it a very intense tropical cyclone. Meanwhile, 1-minute sustained winds reached 260 km/h (160 mph), corresponding to Category 5-equivalent intensity on the Saffir–Simpson scale. After reaching its peak intensity, the cyclone moved toward the northern Mascarene Islands and made landfall near Mananjary, Madagascar on 21 February. It weakened further across Madagascar but regained strength upon reaching the Mozambique Channel, where it intensified and made its second landfall near Vilankulos, Mozambique on 24 February. After moving across Mozambique, the cyclone endured and re-entered the channel on 1 March. It then regained its tropical characteristics and started moving along the coast of Madagascar. Freddy intensified again before making its final landfall near Quelimane, Mozambique on 11 March. It then rapidly weakened as it moved inland and dissipated by 14 March.

Preparations for the storm in the Mascarene Islands included flight groundings, cyclone alerts, and personnel being prepped for the aftermath, among other things. In Madagascar, areas previously affected by Cyclones Batsirai and Cheneso were feared to be worsened by the storm's arrival. Impacts in Mozambique were more severe than in Madagascar and included heavy rainfall in the southern half of the country and widely damaged infrastructure. Effects in Mozambique were exacerbated after its second landfall with further floods and wind damage. The hardest-hit was Malawi where incessant rains caused catastrophic flash floods, especially Blantyre. The nation's power grid was crippled, with its hydroelectric dam rendered inoperable. Overall, the cyclone resulted in at least 1,434 fatalities, 2,004 injuries, 19 people missing, and caused about US$1.53 billion in damage. Consequently, due to the extensive damage and loss of life, the Australian Bureau of Meteorology has retired the name Freddy from the Australian rotating naming lists. In 2025, the name was replaced with Frederic.

== Meteorological history ==
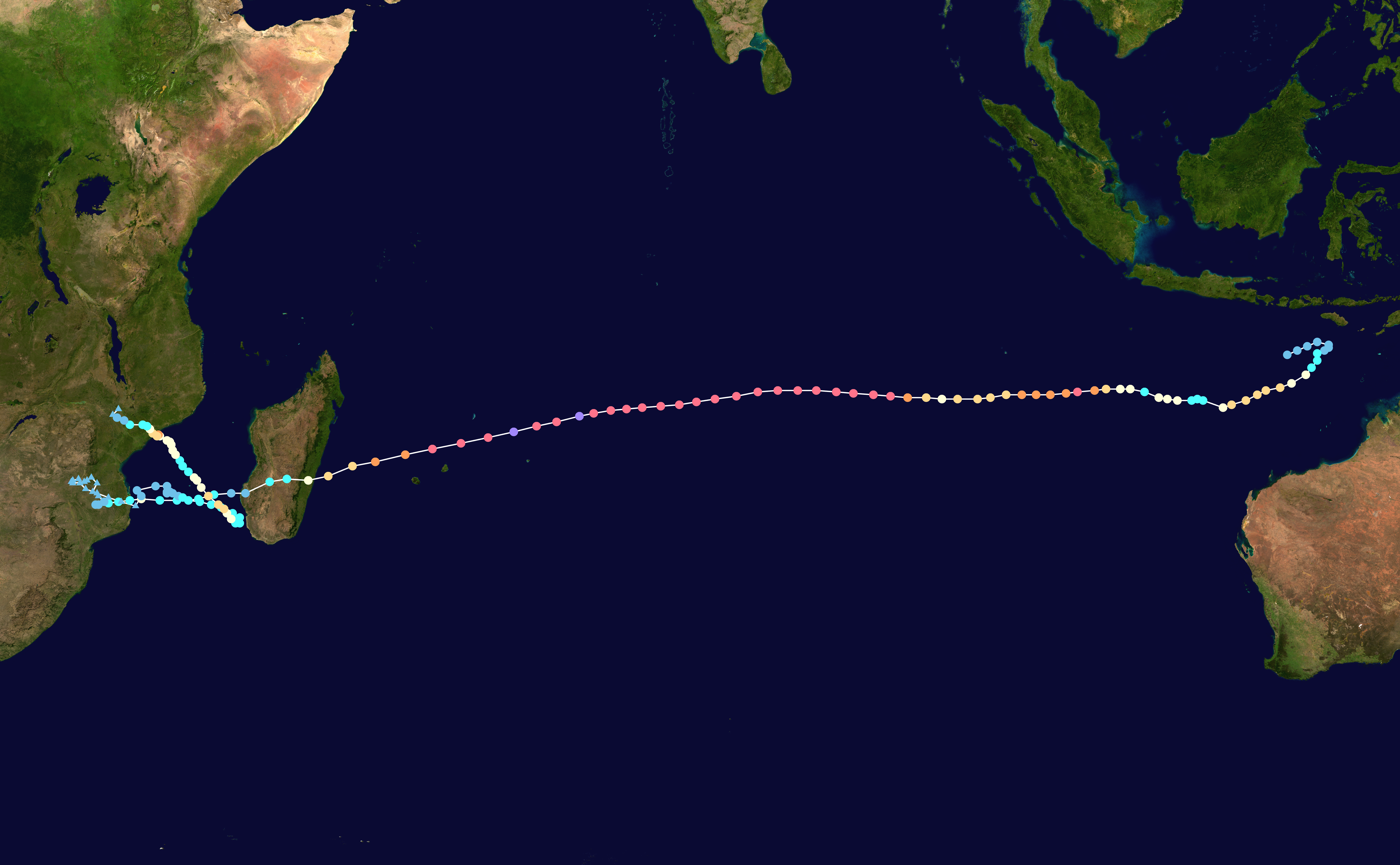
Map plotting the storm's track and intensity, according to the Saffir–Simpson scale Map key Saffir–Simpson scale Tropical depression (≤38 mph, ≤62 km/h) Tropical storm (39–73 mph, 63–118 km/h) Category 1 (74–95 mph, 119–153 km/h) Category 2 (96–110 mph, 154–177 km/h) Category 3 (111–129 mph, 178–208 km/h) Category 4 (130–156 mph, 209–251 km/h) Category 5 (≥157 mph, ≥252 km/h) Unknown Storm type Tropical cyclone Subtropical cyclone Extratropical cyclone, remnant low, tropical disturbance, or monsoon depression

The system that developed into Cyclone Freddy formed on 4 February 2023, when the Australian Bureau of Meteorology (BoM) identified it as Tropical Low 13U. Its formation occurred during an active phase of the Madden–Julian oscillation combined with an equatorial Rossby wave while it was south of the Indonesian archipelago. Later, persistent convection around the system's circulation led the BoM to upgrade the tropical low to a Category 1 tropical cyclone on the Australian scale at 12:00 UTC, and it was assigned the name Freddy. The system became increasingly susceptible to wind shear and dry air intrusion, causing Freddy to weaken back into a minimal tropical storm on 9 February. The cyclone quickly restrengthened with the storm becoming a Category 3 severe tropical cyclone—and at 18:00 UTC on 11 February, the cyclone reached as a high-end Category 4 severe tropical cyclone in the Australian basin. On 14 February, the system tracked over the 90th meridian east and into the South-West Indian Ocean cyclone region, and hence responsibility for the storm transitioned to Météo-France (MFR) at La Réunion.

On 19 February, the MFR upgraded Freddy to a very intense tropical cyclone based on a Dvorak technique rating of T7.0, with 10-minute sustained winds of 220 km/h (140 mph) and an estimated barometric pressure of 931 hPa (27.49 inHg). In post-analysis, the MFR concluded a peak wind speed of 230 km/h (145 mph), and minimum central pressure of 927 hPa (27.37 inHg). The system reached Category 5-equivalent intensity, with the United States Joint Typhoon Warning Center (JTWC) reporting 1-minute sustained winds of 260 km/h (160 mph). The cyclone's eye pattern quickly deteriorated while it was traversing north of the Mascarene Islands. Freddy made landfall as a strong Category 2-equivalent intensity with 1-minute sustained winds of 175 km/h (110 mph) near Mananjary, Madagascar on 21 February. This made Freddy the strongest storm to impact the island nation since Cyclone Batsirai a year earlier.

After crossing Madagascar, its circulation became exposed, and the deep convection was stripped away from the center. Freddy emerged into the Mozambique Channel, quickly re-intensifying into a severe tropical storm on 23 February. Freddy reached Mozambique south of Vilankulos on 24 February, bringing winds of 85 km/h (50 mph), which was just shy of severe tropical storm intensity, before moving into Zimbabwe late on 26 February, where it remained for a couple of days. Freddy entered the channel early on 1 March and continued to intensify, reaching tropical cyclone status as it accelerated eastward towards the coast of Madagascar on 5 March, but then weakened to just below minimal tropical storm strength due to increased wind shear and dry air intrusion. Freddy rapidly intensified once more and made its final landfall near Quelimane, Mozambique, with the JTWC estimated winds of about 175 km/h (110 mph) on 11 March; however, the storm's circulation dissipated shortly thereafter, marking the end of Freddy's time as a tropical cyclone on 14 March.

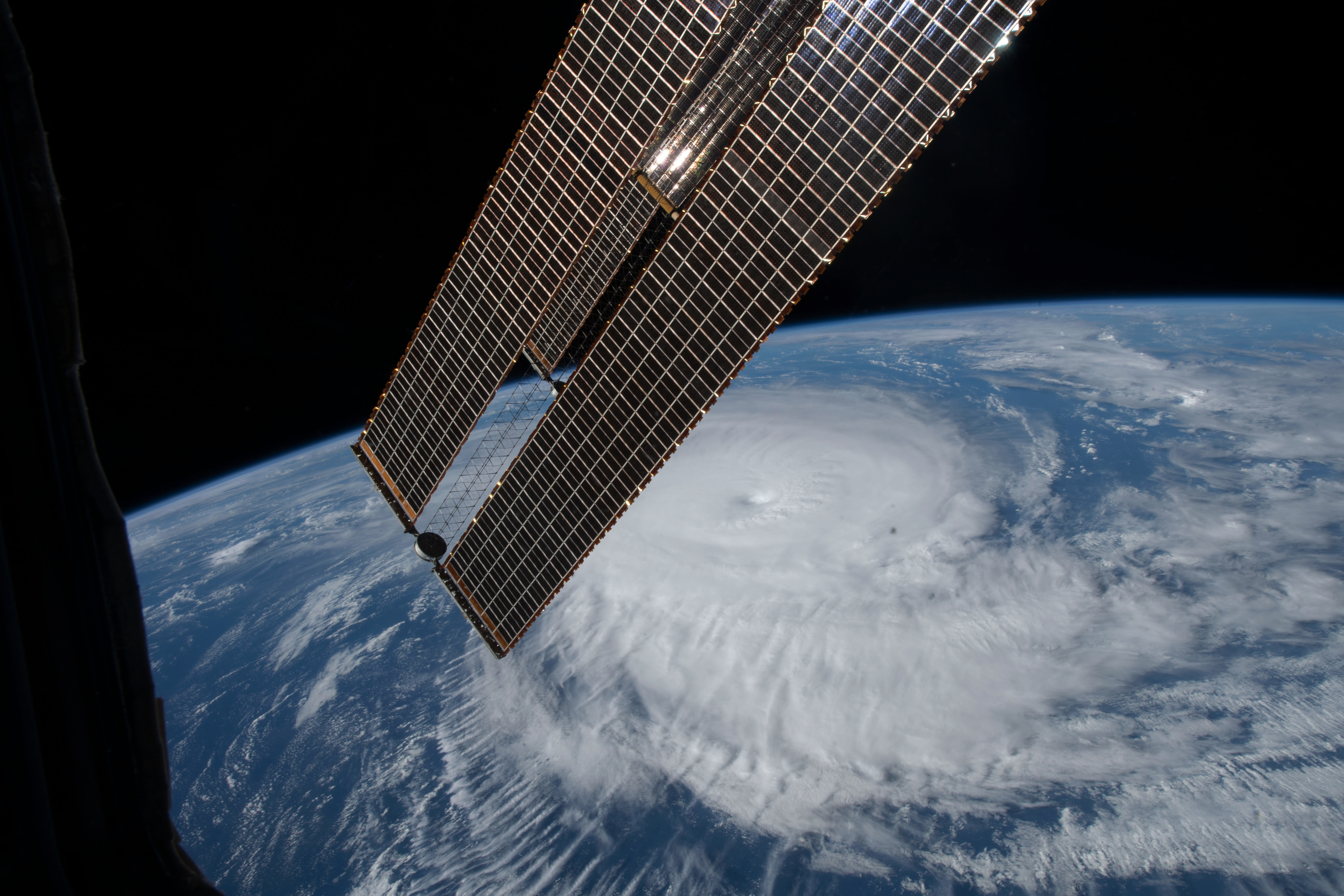
Cyclone Freddy as seen from the International Space Station on 20 February

=== Records ===
Cyclone Freddy lasted 36 days, made it the longest-lasting tropical cyclone worldwide, in terms of the number of days maintaining tropical storm status or higher, beating the previous record set by Hurricane John in 1994. Freddy was also the second-farthest traveling tropical cyclone globally, behind 1994's Hurricane John, with a distance traveled of 12,785 km (7,945 mi). Freddy also holds the record for the second-highest accumulated cyclone energy—a metric that measures the total energy generated by tropical cyclones, at 83.31—just shy of Hurricane Ioke in 2006. Freddy was the tropical cyclone that underwent six separate rounds of rapid intensification. It was also one of only six systems to traverse the entire southern Indian Ocean from east to west, along with cyclones Litanne in 1994 as well as Leon–Eline, Hudah in 2000, Dikeledi in 2025 and Grant in 2026.

== Preparations ==
=== Mascarene Islands ===
Cyclone Freddy approaching Mauritius on 19 February.

A class I cyclone warning was issued by Mauritius for Rodrigues, and later a class II cyclone warning was issued. Flights from Rodrigues to Saint-Denis, Réunion, were canceled or rescheduled due to inclement weather. Prime Minister Pravind Jugnauth stated this during a radio and television address urging vigilance and caution. The Mauritius Meteorological Services (MMS) issued a class III cyclone warning, estimating that Freddy's center gusts might reach up to 300 km/h (185 mph). The country also shut down its stock exchange as the storm neared. A total of 1,019 people sought refuge in public shelters.

On 18 February, a cyclone yellow pre-alert was issued for the island of Réunion by the MFR. The following day, this was upgraded to an orange alert which prompted all schools to close. Hospital patients whose conditions did not require immediate treatment were to return home while those with more care-intensive needs were to be transported to designated facilities. The island's power company, EDF La Réunion, prepped 200 personnel with a further 100 people from subcontracted companies for immediate repairs once storm conditions subsided. Call centers were staffed with 60 additional workers. The company also prepped 50 vehicles, electrical equipment, 15 generators, and 4 helicopters for use. Residents in areas hard-hit by Cyclone Batsirai in February 2022 worried of exacerbated damage upon Freddy's arrival. Authorities in Le Tampon were mobilizing for the system's arrival. High seas prompted the closure of the Nouvelle route du Littoral with bus shuttles established to transport residents through inland routes to and from communities in the north and west. On 20 February, the RSMA-R mobilized 250 personnel for relief efforts. All service at Roland Garros Airport was suspended the same day, with service to resume following the cyclone's passage. A red alert for coastal flooding was issued for areas between Champs Borne and Pointe des Cascades. The city of Saint-Benoît opened two public shelters and closed all sporting facilities. Officials in Saint-Pierre postponed a local carnival for more than two weeks.

=== Madagascar ===
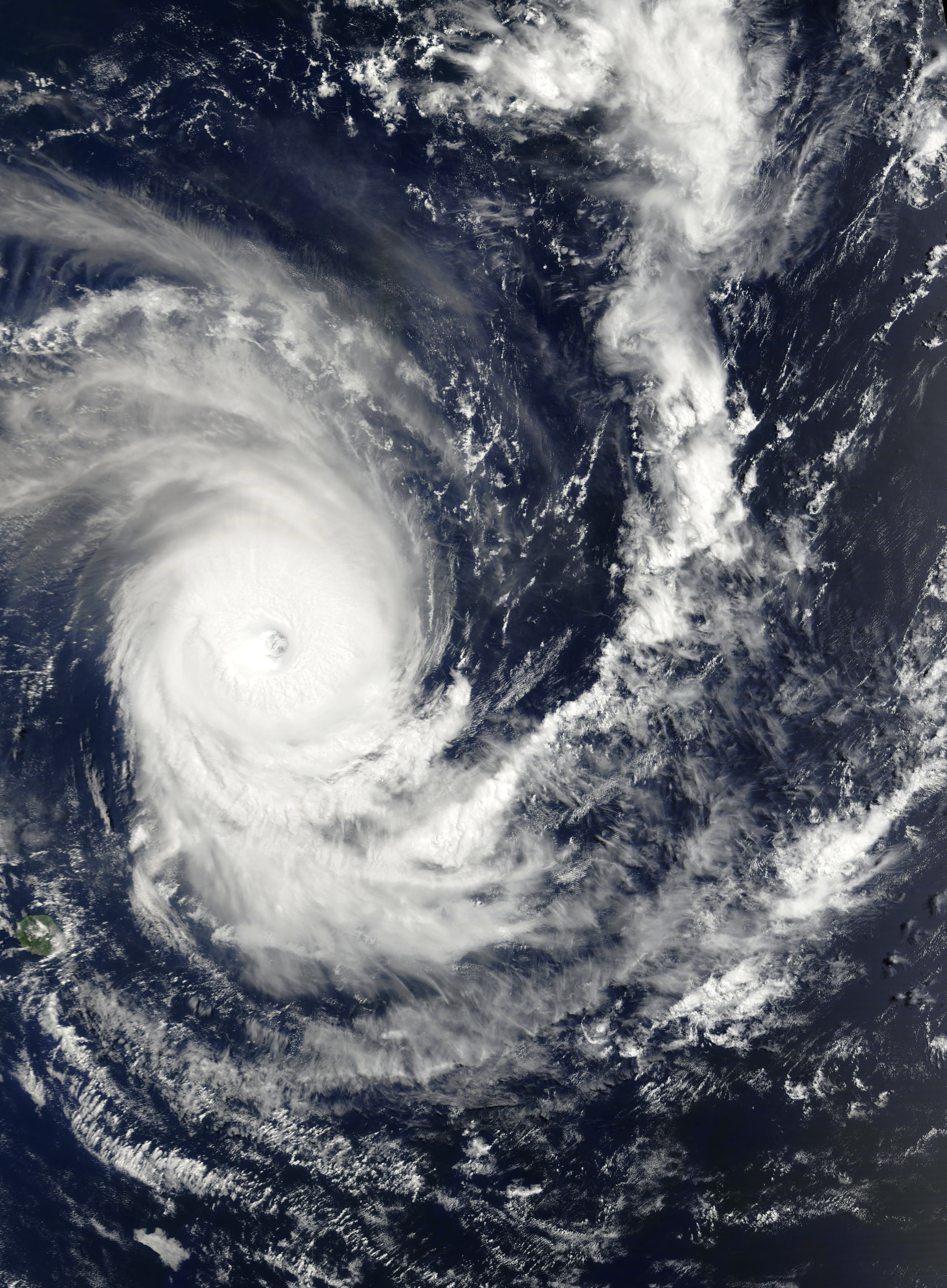
Cyclone Freddy passing by Mauritius on 20 February

Cyclone Freddy threatened areas of Madagascar still reeling from the successive impacts of Cyclones Batsirai and Emnati in 2022; 874,000 people remained food insecure in the region. Medair noted that the region was suffering from a surge in childhood malnutrition stemming from an inadequate humanitarian response to the aforementioned cyclones. On 18 February, General Directorate of Meteorology issued warnings for the Analanjirofo and Sava regions, advising residents to take precautions as the cyclone was expected to make landfall. In the landfall area, Madagascar's weather service noted "torrential rains" and "very high to enormous seas" were of concern. The government of Madagascar pre-positioned 120 tonnes (120 long tons; 130 short tons) of rice to areas threatened by Freddy. Transportation services and schools were closed on 21 February. Residents at risk of Freddy placed sandbags over their homes' roofs for reinforcement.

The International Federation of Red Cross and Red Crescent Societies (IFRC) in Madagascar announced it was preparing for the cyclone. Météo-France noted on 19 February that accumulations for 200 mm (7.9 in) were possible for the southern regions of Madagascar. The Global Disaster Alert and Coordination System estimated over 2.2 million people would be affected by Freddy's storm surge and flooding in the country. Tents, ropes, chainsaws, and other supplies have been sent by the National Office for Risk and Disaster Management (BNGRC) to the eastern districts. The United Nations Office for the Coordination of Humanitarian Affairs (OCHA) and its partners deployed 80 humanitarian staff to Mahanoro, Mananjary, and Manakara, and placed two aircraft on standby. The agency was unable to sufficiently allocate emergency supplies due to a lack of funding and shortages from Cyclone Cheneso the month prior. Medair already had field offices in place after Cyclone Cheneso in southern and southeastern Madagascar. Emphasis was placed on providing clean drinking water and emergency kits to residents in Marondava and Maroansetra. At least 7,000 people were pre-emptively evacuated from at-risk coastal regions before Freddy's arrival.

=== Mozambique and Malawi ===
In February 2023, local reports had estimated over 600,000 people were expected to be affected in the country by the cyclone alone. Rainfall predictions reached 200–300 mm (7.9–11.8 in) south of Beira into Inhambane Province, with 400 mm (16 in) locally. Overall, a month's worth of rain was forecasted. The country's national meteorological service issued a red alert on 21 February. Freddy's intense and prolonged rainfall was also feared to worsen flooding in central and northern areas, affecting up to 1.75 million people, this rainfall also caused deadly landslides. Rescue teams, food supplies, tents, and boats were put in place to support the aftermath.

During March 2023, as Freddy approached a second time, the Mozambique National Meteorology Institute (INAM) predicted torrential rains of more than 200 mm (7.9 in) in 24 hours in the provinces of Manica, Sofala, Tete, and Zambezia. Peak rainfall was forecasted to be between 400–500 mm (16–20 in). According to the National Institute for Disaster Risk Management and Reduction (INGD), approximately 565,000 people were at risk, though a United Nations and European Union-led disaster alert predicted 2.3 million were at risk. Thousands were moved to evacuation shelters as precaution. Cyclone Freddy was expected to hit Malawi, and bring with it torrential rains and damaging winds to the southern region. Forecasts predicted accumulations of rainfall there could reach 400–500 mm (16–20 in). The Ministry of Education ordered the suspension of all classes in districts at risk.

== Impact ==
Deaths and damage by country
Nation/Territory	Fatalities	Missing	Injuries	Affected	Damage (2023 USD)
Madagascar	17	3	—N/a	299,000	—N/a
Malawi	1,216	—N/a	1,724	>500,000	$507 million
Mauritius	1	16 (Note: The missing persons for Mauritius were from a capsized Taiwanese-flagged fishing trawler that was found within the nation's exclusive economic zone.)	0	2,500	—N/a
Mozambique	198	—N/a	280	≥1,074,970	$290 million
Réunion	0	0	0	≥25,000	—N/a
Zimbabwe	2	0	0	—N/a	—N/a
Totals:	1,434	19	2,004	≥1,712,987	$1.53 billion

In general, Freddy produced extraordinarily heavy rains, primarily in Mozambique and Malawi. Heavy winds lashed areas as well, and infrastructure took heavy hits due to excessive flooding. Freddy's stalling over Mozambique and Malawi worsened the rains immensely.

=== Mascarene Islands ===
According to the MMS, the cyclone passed within 200 km (120 mi) of Mauritius, just north of Grand Bay. Strong winds and waves were observed along the northern coast of Mauritius. Winds in Port Louis reached 104 km/h (65 mph) while a peak gust of 154 km/h (96 mph) was observed on Signal Mountain. Flooding and gale-force winds also affected the country. According to media reports, there was one fatality, and at least 500 displaced families in a variety of shelters across Mauritius.

Around 4:00 a.m. local time on 20 February, contact was lost with the Taiwanese-flagged fishing trawler LV Lien Sheng Fa with a crew of 16 just outside the territorial waters of Mauritius. The crew included a Taiwanese captain and 15 Indonesian fishermen. An alert was sent out by Taiwan's Fisheries Agency for the missing vessel on 23 February. The MV Star Venture found the ship capsized on 25 February about 400 km (250 mi) northeast of Mauritius within the nation's exclusive economic zone. Later sorties by the aircraft Dornier and the ship CGA Baracuda failed to find any survivors. Mauritius deployed a diving team to confirm the identity of the ship. The vessel's lifeboat was confirmed to have been deployed; however, it has not been found as of 3 March.

Freddy impacted Réunion on 20–21 February, with its effects being relatively limited. Nearly 25,000 customers were left without power at the height of the cyclone; all but 500 had their service restored within a day. In Saint-Paul, 20 tons of mangoes were destroyed. Highway RD48 in Salazie was closed due to a landslide. Eleven mobile sites maintained by Orange S.A. were knocked offline in Tampon, Saint-Louis, and Saint-Paul. On 23 February, Foehn winds on the backside of the storm led to temperatures reaching 31 to 36 °C (88 to 97 °F) along the southwestern coast of Réunion.

=== Madagascar ===
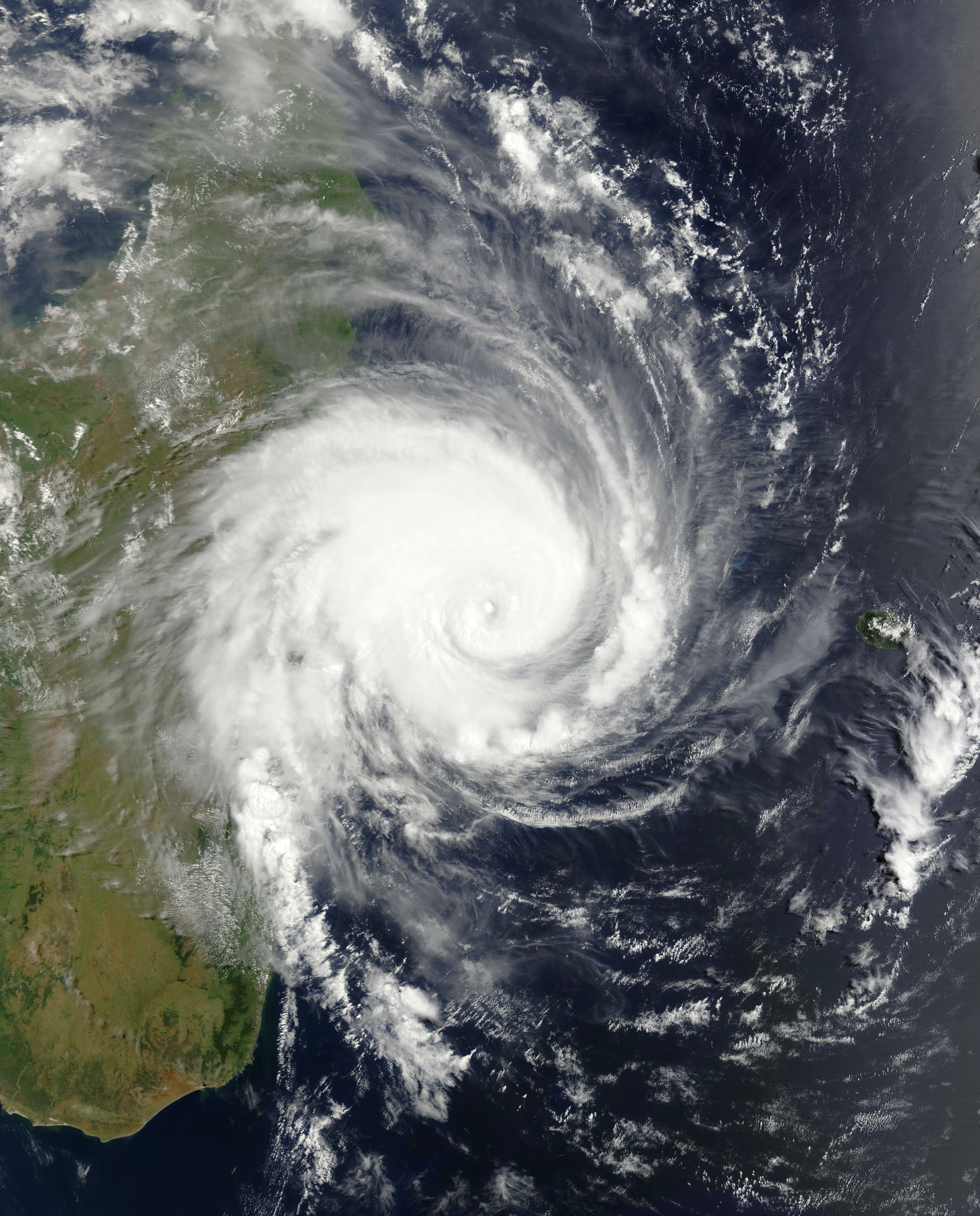
Cyclone Freddy approaching Madagascar on 21 February

Damage was less than expected due to Freddy's weaker-than-forecasted winds, and early preparations. Freddy made its first landfall near Mananjary, which was still recovering from Cyclone Batsirai a year earlier. In total, over 14,000 homes were affected, with 1,206 destroyed, 3,079 flooded, and at least 9,696 damaged. At least 22,500 people were displaced, with over 12,000 in Mananjary alone. Freddy also left 79 schools roofless, and damaged or destroyed 37 and 6 respectively. The storm's effects caused more 11,000 to flee their homes. The impact zone of Freddy included 13-15 municipalities. About 16 km^{2} (6.2 sq mi) of land was flooded according to UNOSAT. Overall, the cyclone was responsible for seven deaths, and affected 226,000.

On its second arrival, Cyclone Freddy brought severe rains to the southwestern portion of the country. At least 72,600 people were affected by the cyclone, including 20 people who were displaced, of whom 16,367 are in 34 temporary sites in several districts, and over 7,900 are living with relatives in the regions of Menabe and Atsimo Andrefana. 158 of which were destroyed, 67 of which were damaged, and 55 of which had no roofs. Overall, 12,400 houses (6,000 of which were flooded, 900 of which were damaged, and 5,500 of which were destroyed) and 280 classrooms, some 28,000 students were prevented from attending school. Ten people have died and three were missing.

=== Mozambique ===
During February 2023, Cyclone Freddy made its first landfall in Mozambique (and second landfall overall) south of Vilanculos, Inhambane Province, causing heavy rains, strong winds, and rough seas. Some damage was reported, primarily due to fallen trees and rooftops. Public infrastructure and services have also suffered widespread damage, including 60 health units, 1,012 schools. At least ten people died in the country during the first landfall. Over 166,600 were affected. Much of the southern half of the country saw rainfall totaling 200 to 500 mm (7.9 to 19.7 in). Thousands of homes were damaged, with approximately 28,300 destroyed. 1,265 km (786 mi) of road across many were damaged. More than 92,000 hectares of crops were affected, and more than 18,700 hectares of crops were lost in areas where 400,000 were food insecure. The storm struck during a cholera outbreak, raising worries of the storm worsening its effects.

Cyclone Freddy off the coast of Mozambique on 11 March.

In March 2023, Freddy made its second landfall in Zambezia Province on 11 March, bringing torrential rainfall, storm surge, and much stronger winds compared to the prior landfall. The Zambezi and Tambarara river basins had reported above-average water levels before its landfall. The power utility had turned off the electricity completely as a precaution against the cyclone. Locals reported seeing roofs torn off houses, broken windows, and streets flooded in Quelimane. Sustained winds of 175 km/h (110 mph), gusting up to 215 km/h (130 mph) were recorded in the city. All flights were suspended due to the inclement weather brought by Freddy.

Communications and electrical supplies were cut early into the storm, hampering damage assessments. Power company Electricidade de Moçambique said that most areas had electricity restored by 11 March mid-afternoon. The nation's UNICEF chief of advocacy, communications, and partnerships, Guy Taylor, stated that there was "lots of destruction", and that Freddy was "potentially a disaster of large magnitude". Taylor also noted that rural areas were completely destroyed. Access to clean water was effectively cut off in Quelimane.

Wettest tropical cyclones and their remnants in Mozambique Highest-known totals
Precipitation			Storm	Location	Ref.
Rank	mm	in	Storm	Location	Ref.
1	672	26.46	Freddy 2023	Marromeu	
2	600	24	Idai 2019	Chimoio	
3	502	19.76	Eline 2000	Levubu	
4	281	11.06	Delfina 2003		
5	200	7.87	Jokwe 2008	Nampula	
6	190	7.50	Japhet 2003		

State TV reported that hundreds were displaced in Freddy's wake. More than 650 houses in Marromeu District, and over 3,000 in Sofala province were affected by flooding. The nation saw a year's worth of rainfall in just 4 weeks. Locals said localized flooding was an issue even before landfall. In a preliminary satellite evaluation of 24,000 km^{2} (9,300 sq mi) of land, 900 km^{2} (350 sq mi) was estimated to be flooded. Widespread areas received over 500–1,000 mm (20–39 in) of rainfall, with smaller, localized pockets of 1,000–1,500 mm (39–59 in), eclipsing the maximum accumulations of Cyclone Idai 4 years earlier. 348,000 hectares of cropland were damaged, and over 800,000 people were living in flooded areas following Freddy. Cholera cases also increased among affected populations. A total of 8 provinces were damaged by the cyclone. 1,017 schools took a hit, and more than 5,000 km (3,100 mi) of road was damaged. This includes the main national road, N1, which was restored by 21 March. A total of 103,000 houses were destroyed, and another 25,000 had been flooded. Some 15,000 people were stranded when they moved to higher ground for protection.

The old provincial hospital in Quelimane had its roof blown off, making supporting those in need more difficult. Many people were left homeless during the storm and took shelter in schools, the latter being turned into reception areas. Large amounts of crop fields were flooded as well. The INGD stated that the storm's effects on Mozambique were worse than expected. Freddy affected areas were initially deemed safe beforehand. Overall, Freddy caused at least 143 deaths on its second arrival. At least 886,487 people were affected as well. An estimated 49,000 were displaced and another 280 were injured. At least 22 deaths from cholera were blamed on Freddy and the subsequent flooding. The National Roads Administration (ANE) claimed that NT18.3 billion (US$290 million) was required for road re-construction.

=== Malawi ===
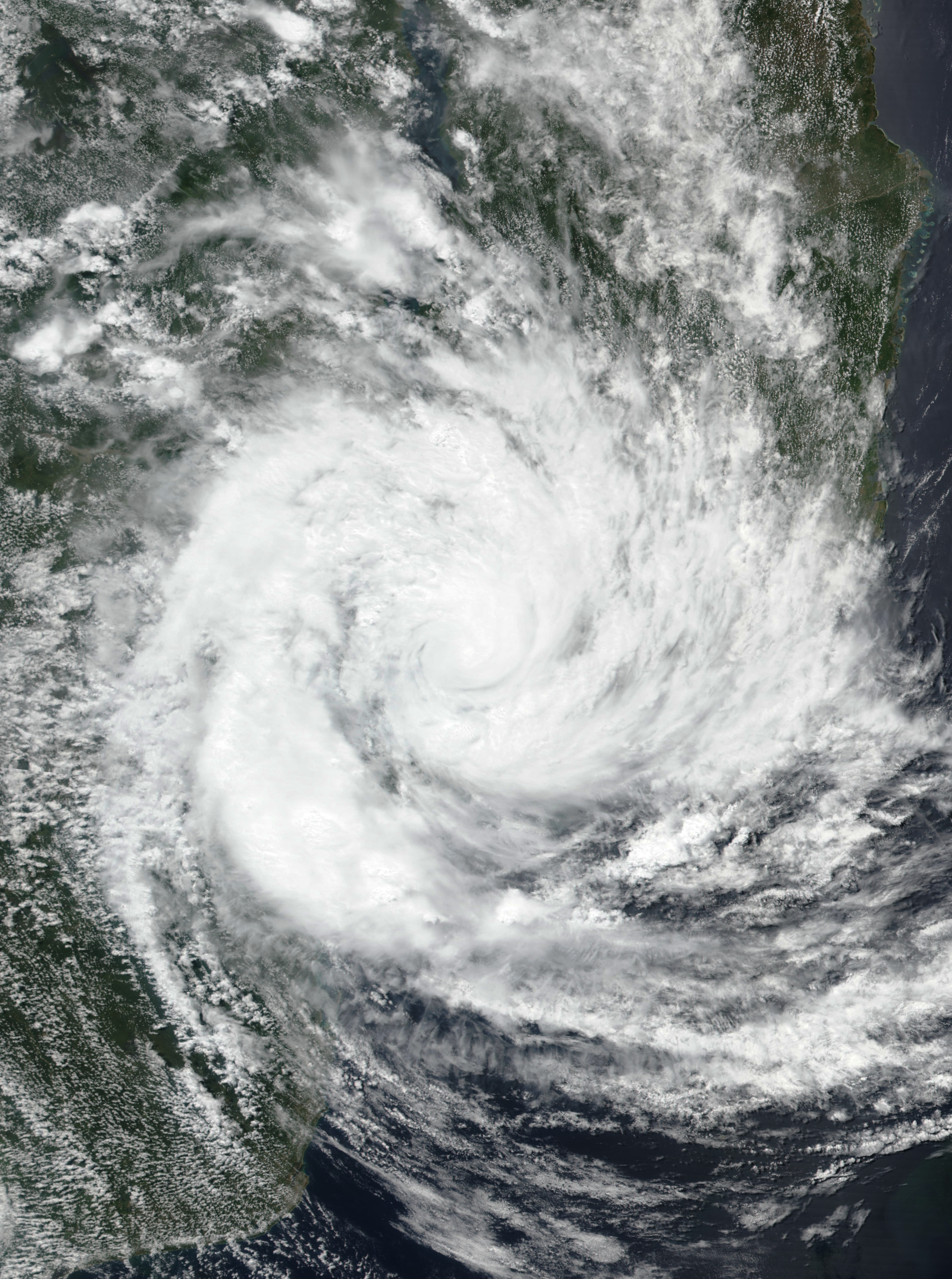
Moderate Tropical Storm Freddy weakening after its landfall in Mozambique on 12 March.

Before Freddy arrived in Malawi, the country had been experiencing its worst cholera outbreak in history. Freddy's effects increased fears among the public that it would worsen. Rainfall was heaviest in the southern region of the country. These districts include Blantyre, Phalombe, Mulanje, Chikhwawa, and Nsanje. Flash floods devastated many regions, washing away homes and people and leaving infrastructure ruined. The entire nation experienced blackout due to the Electricity Generation Company Malawi Limited (EGENCO) shutting down power to avoid further damage to power-generating machines. The nation's hydroelectric power plant, which provides a large portion of the country with electricity, was rendered inoperable by debris.

At least 1,216 people were killed in the onslaught of Freddy with 1,332 injuries reported. At least 192 of these deaths were reported in Blantyre, and at least 40 of whom were children according to Médecins Sans Frontières. 135 of them were in Mulanje as well. 180,000 people were displaced across the country and forced to evacuate their homes, with 500,000 affected in general. Among these 280,000 were children. There were also around 90 fatalities in Mulanje. More than 50,000 houses were damaged or destroyed. In terms of rainfall, over a month's worth of rain was dumped in just a day, totaling to six months of precipitation in six days. The small village of Mtauchira in Chiradzulu District was completely destroyed by a landslide that fell from Chambe Peak.

Over 430 km^{2} (170 sq mi) of general land was flooded, causing many smallholder farmers to have their crops and fields lost to the storm. Approximately 204,833 hectares of cropland were inundated - 84,930 being submerged and 119,930 were washed away. The storm struck just as farmers were about to harvest, compounding to local food insecurities in the nation. Farms were also damaged and many were destroyed. Livestock was severely impacted, with 194,500 dying and a further 91,000 being injured. Notable rainfall recordings include a record-setting 458 mm (18.0 in) in 24 hours in Phalombe District. Several other districts also reported 300 mm (12 in) in the same time range. Flood waters rose in some areas days after Freddy died, with an analyzed area of 5,000 km^{2} (1,900 sq mi) increasing by 60 km^{2} (23 sq mi) between 14 and 17 March. Houses whose foundations were weakened by the system also collapsed in Mangochi District.

Dozens of houses were reported being washed away in floodwaters in Chilobwe. Schools in ten southern regions were ordered to be closed until 15 March. Heavy rains also were reported in Salima and Lilongwe. Malawian president Lazarus Chakwera declared a state of disaster in the southern regions. Victims were thought to be buried under rubble and debris. During Freddy's extended stay in the country, visibility remained at near-zero levels. Several roads and bridges were cut, and many areas were cut off. Landslides across Chiradzulu Mountain blocked roadways, leaving Chiradzulu Boma inaccessible. It was stated that 14 districts suffered impacts from Freddy, equating to over half the country. Chakwera also said that 36 roads were broken, nine bridges washed away, and there were still many villages inaccessible by 20 March. Total damage across the nation was calculated at US$506.7 million.

=== Elsewhere in mainland Africa ===
Heavy rainfall extending from Freddy impacted eastern Zimbabwe for a prolonged period as it meandered over Mozambique and the Mozambique Channel. At the end of February as the storm moved over Mozambique, heavy rains and strong winds impacted the nation. Five homes and two schools had their roofs torn off in Mashonaland Central Province. One person was killed in Shamva on 26 February when the tree they were sheltering from the rain under collapsed. A second person was killed by unspecified causes. In Masvingo Province, one home was destroyed by rainfall and another was struck by lightning. Manicaland Province in particular was heavily affected with continuous rainfall from 12 to 14 March. Observed rainfall totals include 102 mm (4.0 in) in Nyanga and 97 mm (3.8 in) in Mukandi. Crops were adversely affected in the Chipinge and Chiredzi districts. Rainfall of at least 251 mm (9.9 in) occurred across regions of South Africa and Eswatini. Heavy rainfall also occurred in Zambia.

== Aftermath ==
Costliest South-West Indian Ocean tropical cyclones
Rank	Tropical cyclones	Season	Damage
1	5 Chido	2024–25	$3.9 billion
2	4 Idai	2018–19	$3.3 billion
3	3 Gezani	2025–26	$2 billion
4	5 Freddy	2022–23	$1.53 billion
5	3 Garance	2024–25	$1.05 billion
6	3 Fytia	2025–26	$475 million
7	4 Enawo	2016–17	$400 million
8	4 Kenneth	2018–19	$345 million
9	4 Leon–Eline	1999–00	$309 million
10	4 Dina	2001–02	$287 million

Due to the storm striking during a historic cholera outbreak, water purification supplies were in critical need, and in short supply. Following Freddy, many countries sent relief aid to southern Africa, with a particular emphasis on the humanitarian disaster in Malawi. Among the items sent were hygiene supplies, food rations, and safe drinking water. Total donations reached the millions in USD, and there was a main focus on the region's historic and ongoing cholera outbreak. Several nations also expressed condolences to Malawi, Mozambique, and Madagascar.

As a result of the major loss of life and damage in Malawi and surrounding countries, the name Freddy was removed from the rotating lists of Australian region cyclone names and it will not be used to name a storm in that basin again. The name Frederic was chosen to replace it in August 2025.

=== Madagascar ===
64 tons of food relief rations were made available following Freddy's passing. Several shelter sites were opened, with many being vacated within a day of the storm. The World Food Programme offered thousands of hot meals to those in shelters. Financial assistance was planned to be provided to 100,000 people for up to two months, and food assistance to 40,000 for three months. OCHA has provided WFP with a $100 million Emergency Cash Grant, which will be utilized for immediate aerial inspections and logistics support following the cyclone. WFP has sent a 6x6 truck carrying five metric tons of high-energy biscuits to Toliara as part of the emergency response.

=== Mozambique ===
UNICEF provided water purification supplies, medical items, tents, and hygiene kits among other things to help families and children. By 13 March, 5,000 were living in the accommodation and over 100,000 needed humanitarian assistance. The government was not prepared for a storm of Freddy's magnitude, and struggled to provide an effective response. Amnesty International suggested that Mozambique be compensated for impacts by Freddy, due to being least responsible for climate change. By 24 March 230 accommodation centers remained operational, housing 184,282 people. The WFP also provided 7-day rations of food through cash-based transfers for 17,545 people.

Mozambican president, Filipe Nyusi, appealed for aid and to rebuild infrastructure. He also provided MT250 million ($3.9 million) to Zambezia province to help restore everyday activities. The WFP requires $26.7 million to assist 541,000 people impacted by Cyclone Freddy. As a result of flooding caused by the storm as well as the cutoff of access to water, sanitation, and hygiene services, cholera cases began to rapidly increase. At least 36 districts spanning 8 provinces are having outbreaks; the Inhambane and Zambezia provinces, which were heavily affected by Freddy, have declared outbreaks of cholera. The cumulative figure for the cases by 21 March stood at 11,158 across the provinces, and other waterborne illnesses such as diarrhea and malaria were of risk. The INGD did not have food and supplies for immediate response, significantly slowing emergency aid. As the nation tries to contain a rapidly spreading outbreak, Mozambique has requested an additional 2 million doses of a cholera vaccine from the World Health Organization.

=== Malawi ===
"The destruction and suffering that I witnessed in southern Malawi is the human face of the global climate crisis."

— Rebecca Adda-Dontoh, the United Nations Resident Coordinator for Malawi

By 18 March the Government of Malawi established 534 camps to house 508,244 displaced persons, equating to 101,648 households. Humanitarian partners worked closely with the government despite the harsh conditions brought by Freddy. Relief items placed before the storm were used to support families. Rescue teams were sent in Chilobwe, Machinjiri and Ndirande residential areas in Blantyre. Malawian citizens pooled resources to help displaced victims in Blantyre residential areas. Amnesty International suggested that Malawi be compensated for impacts by Freddy, due to being least responsible for climate change as well.

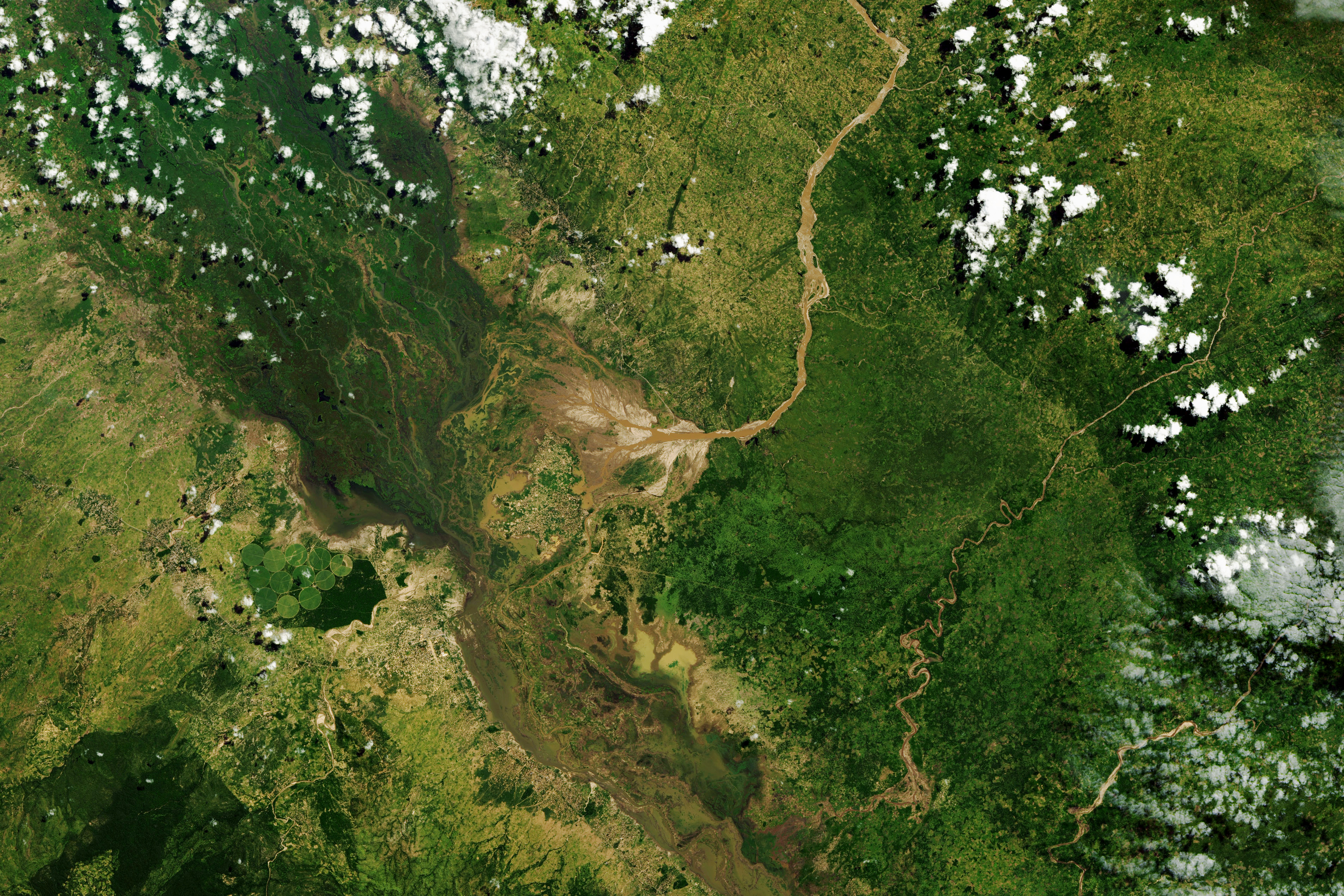
Operational Land Imager captured this satellite (top right), which depicts damaged farmland in southern Malawi on 10 April.

Government-led search-and-rescue operations consisting of the Red Cross, local military, and police also commenced following the storm. On 16 March alone, 442 people were rescued. Sniffer dogs were also used for such operations, as many people were trapped under rubble and mud. Several areas were still rendered inaccessible days after Freddy dissipated. Millions of children were at risk of an increase in cholera cases as well. Due to cholera being transmitted through contaminated water and food, Freddy's flooding rose worries of the disease spreading greatly. Chakwera also invited the country's former presidents to a caucus to discuss methods and strategies to respond to the cyclone. It took up to a week or more for families in cut off areas to receive aid, mostly by helicopters provided by Tanzania, Zambia, and Malawi's defense force.

Food prices jumped by over 300%, quadrupling to record heights in Malawi, which was already a food-insecure nation. Maize prices also shot up 400% in places like Nsanje. The Everlasting Life Missionary Church donated assorted clothes to survivors in Zomba. They also fed children at camps, some of whom had not eaten at all since Freddy. They also sent out basic supplies such as body lotion, soap, and others. The crisis that ensued after Freddy also presented several negative mental health consequences among locals and frontline aid workers. Various protection services were interrupted (including childcare centers), and gender-based violence was highlighted as a prominent issue. Those affected also trafficked women, adolescent girls, and other children. Families were separated, leaving youth unattended and alone. EGENCO resumed operations at the Nkula and Tedzani power stations on 14 March as water along the Shire River returned to safer levels. Lazarus Chakwera declared a national two weeks of mourning for the victims of Freddy. The government promised $1.5 million for aid to those affected. The president surveyed the damage, calling it "far worse than the images and footage we've seen". Malawi's president Lazarus Chakwera has appealed for foreign assistance, claiming that the country requires $700 million for reconstruction.

The OCHA brought vital emergency supplies to the hardest-hit regions. These included medical items, hygiene kits, and even support boats from the World Food Programme for those trapped in floodwaters and rubble. By 16 March, Nsanje had set up 24 camps to accommodate 4,502 households, with Chikwawa having 21 camps for 8,837 homes. Malawian Former President Peter Mutharika has criticized the Chakwera administration of failing to evacuate people in the path of Cyclone Freddy before the disaster struck.

== See also ==
- Tropical cyclones in 2023
- Weather of 2023
- List of the deadliest tropical cyclones
- Tropical cyclones in the Mascarene Islands

Other tropical cyclones similar to Freddy

- Hurricane John (1994) – longest-lasting tropical cyclone in the Northern Hemisphere.
- Cyclone Bonita (1996) – another long-lasting tropical cyclone which also struck Madagascar and Mozambique, also making landfall near Quelimane.
- Hurricane Ioke (2006) – highest ACE-producing tropical cyclone worldwide.
- Cyclone Idai (2019) – a devastating tropical cyclone which also had an erratic track within the Mozambique Channel similar to Freddy.

Related tropical cyclones

- Cyclone Batsirai (2022) – a powerful tropical cyclone that caused catastrophic damage in Madagascar.
- Cyclone Darian (2022) – another strong and long-lasting tropical cyclone that reached VITC status in the same season.
- Cyclone Cheneso (2023) – a strong tropical cyclone that affected Madagascar a month prior.
