= Cyclone Batsirai =

South-West Indian Ocean cyclone in 2022

Intense Tropical Cyclone Batsirai
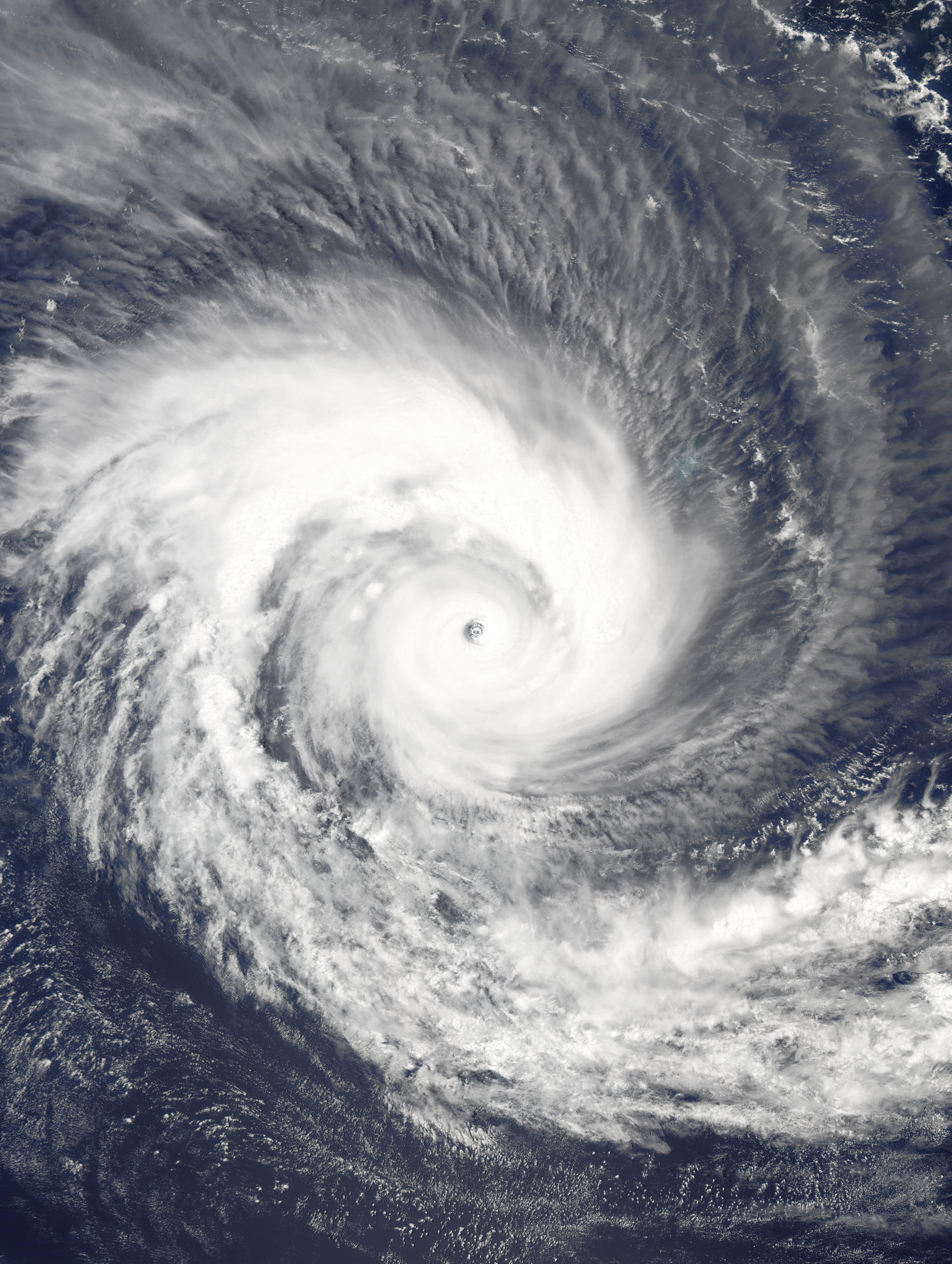
- Cyclone Batsirai near peak intensity northwest of Mauritius on 2 February.

Meteorological history
- Formed: 24 January 2022
- Post-tropical: 8 February 2022
- Dissipated: 11 February 2022

Intense tropical cyclone
- 10-minute sustained (MFR)
- Highest winds: 205 km/h (125 mph)
- Lowest pressure: 923 hPa (mbar); 27.26 inHg

Category 4-equivalent tropical cyclone
- 1-minute sustained (SSHWS/JTWC)
- Highest winds: 230 km/h (145 mph)
- Lowest pressure: 932 hPa (mbar); 27.52 inHg

Overall effects
- Fatalities: 123 total
- Damage: $200 million (2022 USD)
- Areas affected: Mauritius, Réunion, Madagascar
- IBTrACS
- Part of the 2021–22 Australian region and South-West Indian Ocean cyclone seasons

Intense Tropical Cyclone Batsirai was a deadly tropical cyclone which heavily impacted Madagascar in February 2022, becoming the strongest tropical cyclone to strike Madagascar since Cyclone Enawo in 2017. It made landfall two weeks after Tropical Storm Ana brought deadly floods to the island country in late January. The second tropical disturbance, the first tropical cyclone, and the first intense tropical cyclone of the 2021–22 South-West Indian Ocean cyclone season, Batsirai originated from a tropical disturbance that was first noted on 24 January 2022. It fluctuated in intensity and became a moderate tropical storm on 27 January 2022, after which it unexpectedly rapidly intensified into an intense tropical cyclone. It then weakened and struggled to intensify through the coming days due to present wind shear and dry air, where it weakened after some time. Afterward, it entered much more favorable conditions, rapidly intensified yet again to a high-end Category 4 cyclone on the Saffir–Simpson scale while moving towards Madagascar. The storm underwent an eyewall replacement cycle the next day, and fluctuated in intensity before making landfall in Madagascar as a Category 3 cyclone, later rapidly weakening due to the mountainous terrain on the island.

Mauritius and Réunion both experienced damage from the storm, though the effects were relatively minor. 123 deaths were reported due to Batsirai, 121 deaths were reported in Madagascar and 2 deaths were reported in Mauritius. As the storm approached, Madagascar prepared recovery supplies, with worries of significant flooding due to the more barren geography of the country. The United Nations supported preparation and relief efforts for after the storm as well, since millions were expected to be affected by it. Batsirai made landfall in the country early on 5 February, and brought heavy impacts and majorly disrupting power and communication throughout the affected areas. Entire towns were devastated, with thousands of structures being damaged or destroyed. After the storm passed, thousands of people evacuated to temporary shelters. Batsirai left at least 112,000 displaced, and 124,000 homes affected. Overall, Cyclone Batsirai caused a total of US$200 million in damages throughout the storm's life. (Note: All monetary figures are in their 2022 values unless otherwise noted.) The same areas were affected a year later by a more powerful cyclone named Cyclone Freddy.

== Meteorological history ==
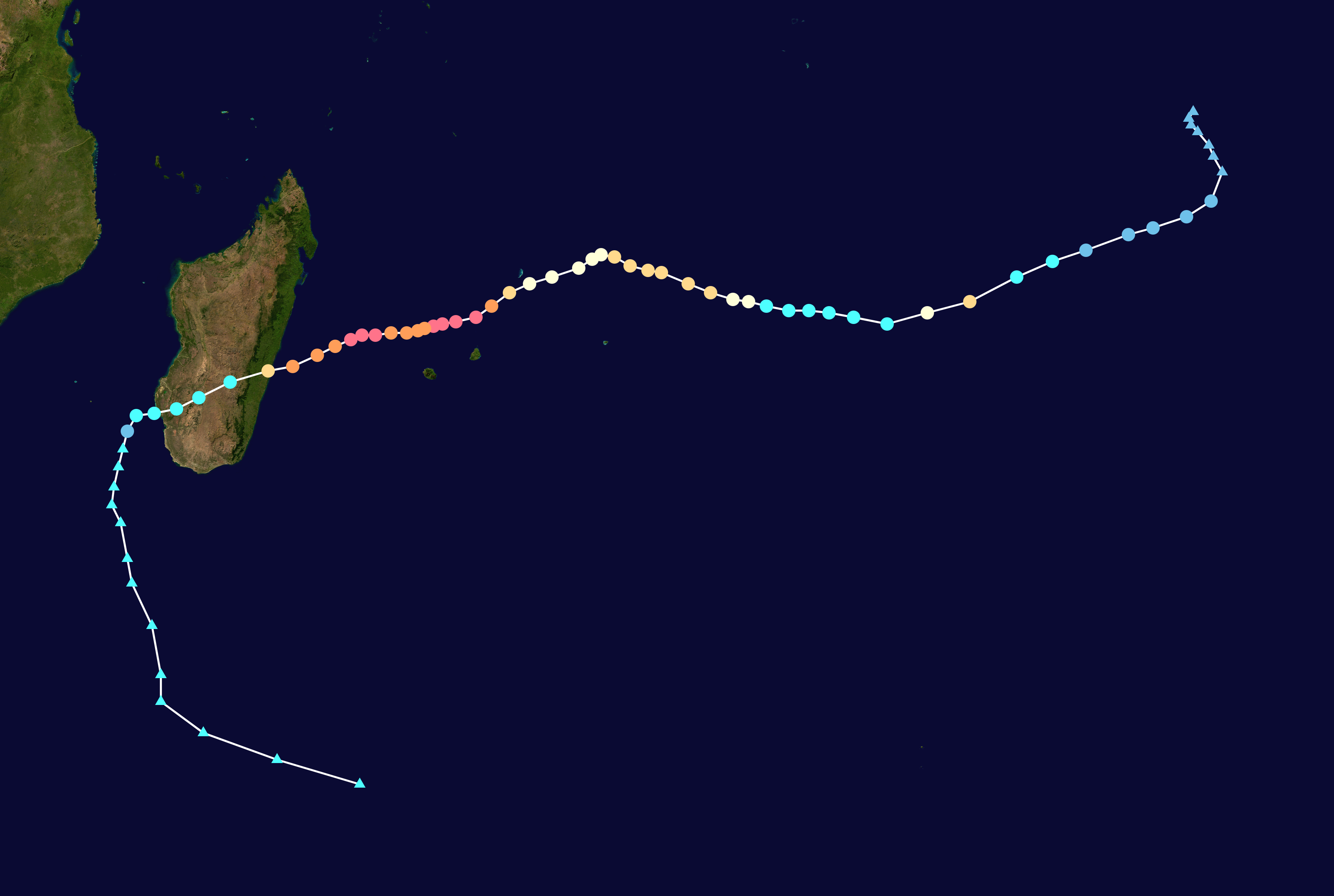
Map plotting the storm's track and intensity, according to the Saffir–Simpson scale Map key Saffir–Simpson scale Tropical depression (≤38 mph, ≤62 km/h) Tropical storm (39–73 mph, 63–118 km/h) Category 1 (74–95 mph, 119–153 km/h) Category 2 (96–110 mph, 154–177 km/h) Category 3 (111–129 mph, 178–208 km/h) Category 4 (130–156 mph, 209–251 km/h) Category 5 (≥157 mph, ≥252 km/h) Unknown Storm type Tropical cyclone Subtropical cyclone Extratropical cyclone, remnant low, tropical disturbance, or monsoon depression

The origins of Cyclone Batsirai can be traced back to 23 January, when the Australian Bureau of Meteorology (BoM) reported that a tropical low had formed outside of the Australian region, well to the northwest of the Cocos Islands. The Météo-France La Réunion (MFR) (Note: Météo-France's meteorological office in Réunion (MFR) is the official Regional Specialized Meteorological Center for the South-West Indian Ocean, tracking all tropical cyclones south of the equator, from the east coast of Africa to 90° E.) took note of the low, along with the Joint Typhoon Warning Center (JTWC) (Note: The Joint Typhoon Warning Center is a joint United States Navy – United States Air Force task force that issues tropical cyclone warnings for the Indian Ocean and other regions.) which designated the low as Invest 96S. The disturbance was located within a marginally favourable environment for further development, with high levels of vertical wind shear, being offset by warm sea surface temperatures of around 29–30 °C (84–86 °F), therefore the agency gave a low chance for potential tropical cyclogenesis within the next 24 hours. A day later at 00:30 UTC, the agency upgraded the probability to medium after the system gradually improved its convective pattern. Later at 21:30 UTC the same day, the agency issued a Tropical Cyclone Formation Alert (TCFA) for Invest 96S, after noting its obscure low-level circulation center. By 25 January, the low briefly entered the Australian region, before exiting by the next day, when the MFR upgraded the low to tropical disturbance status. According to them, the system's convection had shown signs of gradual organization since 24 January. The center had become better defined with low-level clouds converging towards it in a defined circular pattern, suggesting that a closed circulation had formed. The MFR further upgraded it to a tropical depression at 12:00 UTC the same day, as it continued to improve its convective structure along its low-level center. After its convective activity was briefly interrupted after 18:00 UTC due to dry air, The JTWC subsequently initiated advisories on the system and classified it as Tropical Cyclone 08S at 03:00 UTC the next day.

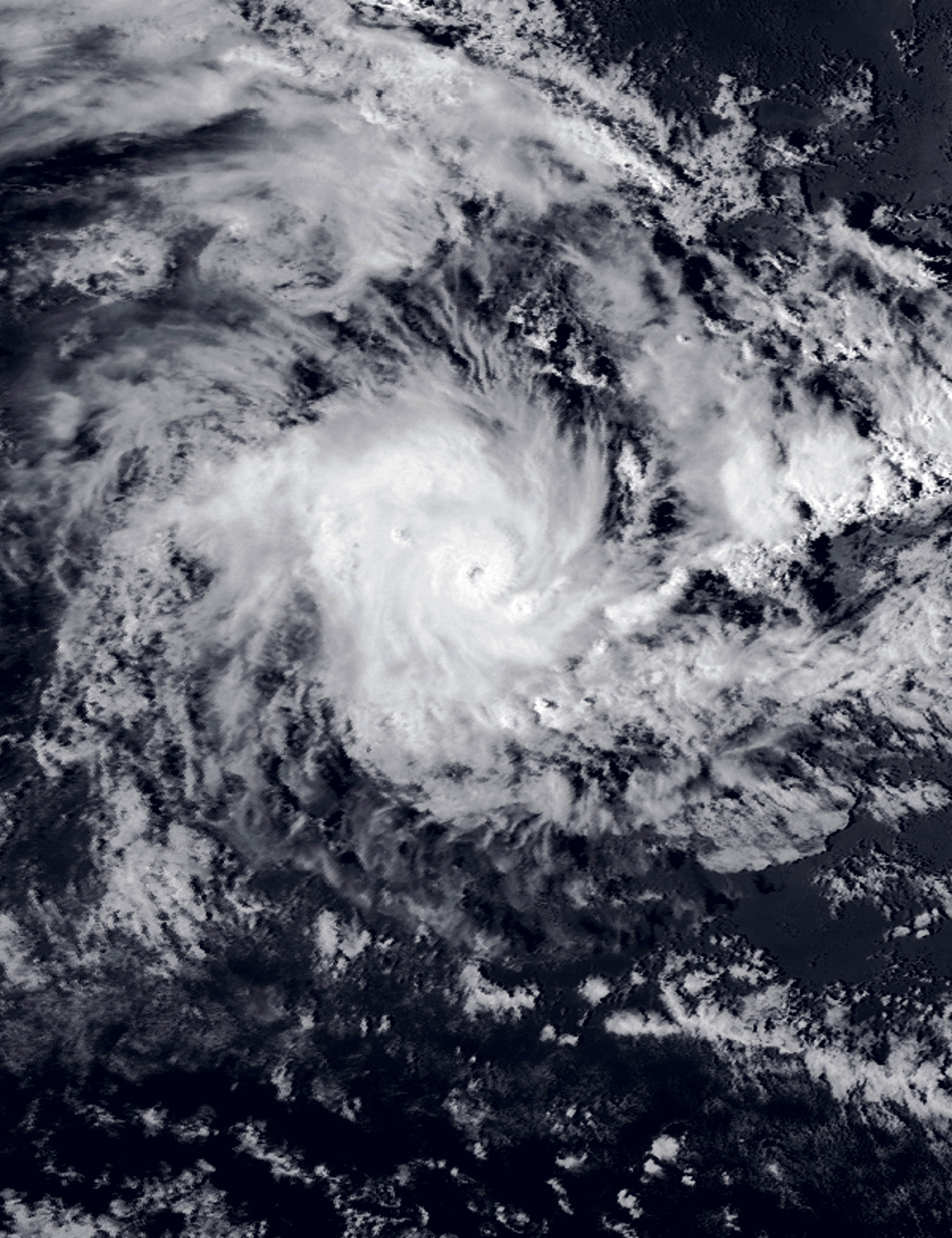
Cyclone Batsirai near its initial peak intensity on 27 January

Three hours later, the MFR reported that the system had become a moderate tropical storm, and the Mauritius Meteorological Services named it Batsirai. (Note: The name Batsirai was provided by Zimbabwe to be used for the sequential naming list for the cyclone season.) (Note: The Sub-Regional Tropical Cyclone Advisory Center (Mauritius Meteorological Services) in Mauritius names a storm if the system intensifies into a moderate tropical storm between 55° E and 90° E.) Between 06:00 UTC and 12:00 UTC, Batsirai underwent rapid deepening and intensified from a moderate tropical storm to an intense tropical cyclone within a span of three hours. According to the MFR, it was favoured by the very small size of the system and its fast movement. It had also established an inner core 75 to 90 km (45 to 55 mi) in diameter. Two hours later, the JTWC also upgraded it to a Category 2 tropical cyclone on the Saffir–Simpson scale, as it developed a small eye at about 7 nmi (13 km; 8.1 mi) in diameter. However, by 18:00 UTC, it started to rapidly decline after its eye quickly collapsed and the cloud tops had warmed. Because of these reasons, the MFR downgraded it to a tropical cyclone. At midnight of 28 January, it was further downgraded to a moderate tropical storm, after further weakening of the convective structure. Three hours later, the JTWC downgraded it back to a tropical storm status.

Batsirai resumed its intensification after being upgraded to a severe tropical storm at 06:00 UTC the next day. Nine hours later, the JTWC upgraded it to a Category 1 tropical cyclone. At 03:00 UTC on 30 January, the JTWC further upgraded it to a Category 2 tropical cyclone after noting a well-defined central dense overcast and a microwave eye feature. The MFR further upgraded it to tropical cyclone status at midday. Three hours later, the JTWC upgraded it to a Category 3 tropical cyclone, as its eyewall had expanded and also developed a 5 nmi (9.3 km; 5.8 mi) wide pinhole-eye. However, this was short-lived, and it weakened to Category 1 status by 03:00 UTC on 1 February, as its pinhole-shaped eye collapsed and its eyewall became disorganized, possibly due to the influence of increasing vertical wind shear. At 15:00 UTC the same day, however, it re - strengthened to Category 2 status, as it managed to consolidate and its eye feature re-appeared on satellite imagery. Three hours later, the MFR upgraded it to an intense tropical cyclone.

By 03:00 UTC on 2 February, the cyclone underwent another round of rapid intensification, intensifying from a Category 2 to a Category 4 tropical cyclone. Its eyewall rapidly organized and also developed a 15 nmi (28 km; 17 mi) wide eye. After reaching its peak at 12:00 UTC, satellite imagery depicted the formation of another eyewall and signs of weakening. It weakened to a Category 3 system during this time. After completing the eyewall replacement cycle, the storm again briefly intensified into a Category 4 system, with MFR determining that Batsirai's central barometric pressure had rapidly fallen to 934 hPa (mbar; 27.58 inHg). It weakened again to a Category 3 system, though it still maintained its overall convective structure.

Gradually weakening due to land interaction with Madagascar, it made landfall at 17:30 UTC on 5 February close to the city of Nosy Varika. MFR declared that Batsirai had degenerated into an overland depression, with the JTWC downgrading it to a tropical storm. The system entered into the Mozambique Channel, and the MFR re-upgraded the system to a moderate tropical storm. By 7 February, it weakened into a remnant low before transitioning into a post-tropical cyclone. Despite fluctuating convective activity, high wind shear, and low sea surface temperatures, due to baroclinic forces, the MFR upgraded the system to a moderate tropical storm once more. It then underwent subtropical transition according to the JTWC, with the agency ceasing advisories on the system on 15:00 UTC of 8 February. MFR issued their last advisory on the storm on 8 February as it again transitioned into a fully post-tropical cyclone, with the system being last noted on 11 February.

== Preparations ==
Cyclone Batsirai rapidly intensifying on 2 February

=== Mauritius ===
A class IV cyclone warning was issued on 2 February as Batsirai neared the island.

=== Madagascar ===
The landfall area of Batsirai was projected to accumulate up to 250 to 500 mm (10 to 20 in) of rainfall. The country's capital, Antananarivo, was predicted to have 150 millimetres (6 in) of rainfall. Search and Rescue teams were deployed in Brickaville, Manakara, and Morondava. The START Network set aside $567,000 to provide assistance. Emergency stock lists were updated by HCT members to help restock humanitarian items. The country's government's disaster management agency worked with UNOSAT as well, and aerial assistance was also prepared as Batsirai approached. Extensive flooding in the east, southeast, and central highlands and major damage were anticipated. The storm was also expected to cause more damage than usual due to the deforestation the country experienced in the last 20 years. The third largest city in the nation, Antsirabe, was forecasted to receive in excess of 250 millimetres (10 in) of rainfall.

Batsirai was expected to worsen food scarcities and emergencies in the country. Schools were closed on 4 February, and residents in low-lying and coastal areas were advised to leave. The storm was also feared to hamper the relief effects of Tropical Storm Ana weeks before. A predicted 4.4 million people were expected to be affected by the storm across 14 districts, with 595,000 directly. More than 150,000 inhabitants were expected be displaced. The IFRC launched a fundraiser to help with potential victims of the storm.

Waves of up to 15 m (49 ft) were forecasted as the storm closed in on the coast. The United Nations worked with aid agencies to help with preparedness and the aftermath. Humanitarian items were stockpiled, and rescue aircraft were put on standby. A spokesman for the UN's organization OCHA, stated the impact of Batsirai was expected to be "considerable".

== Impact ==
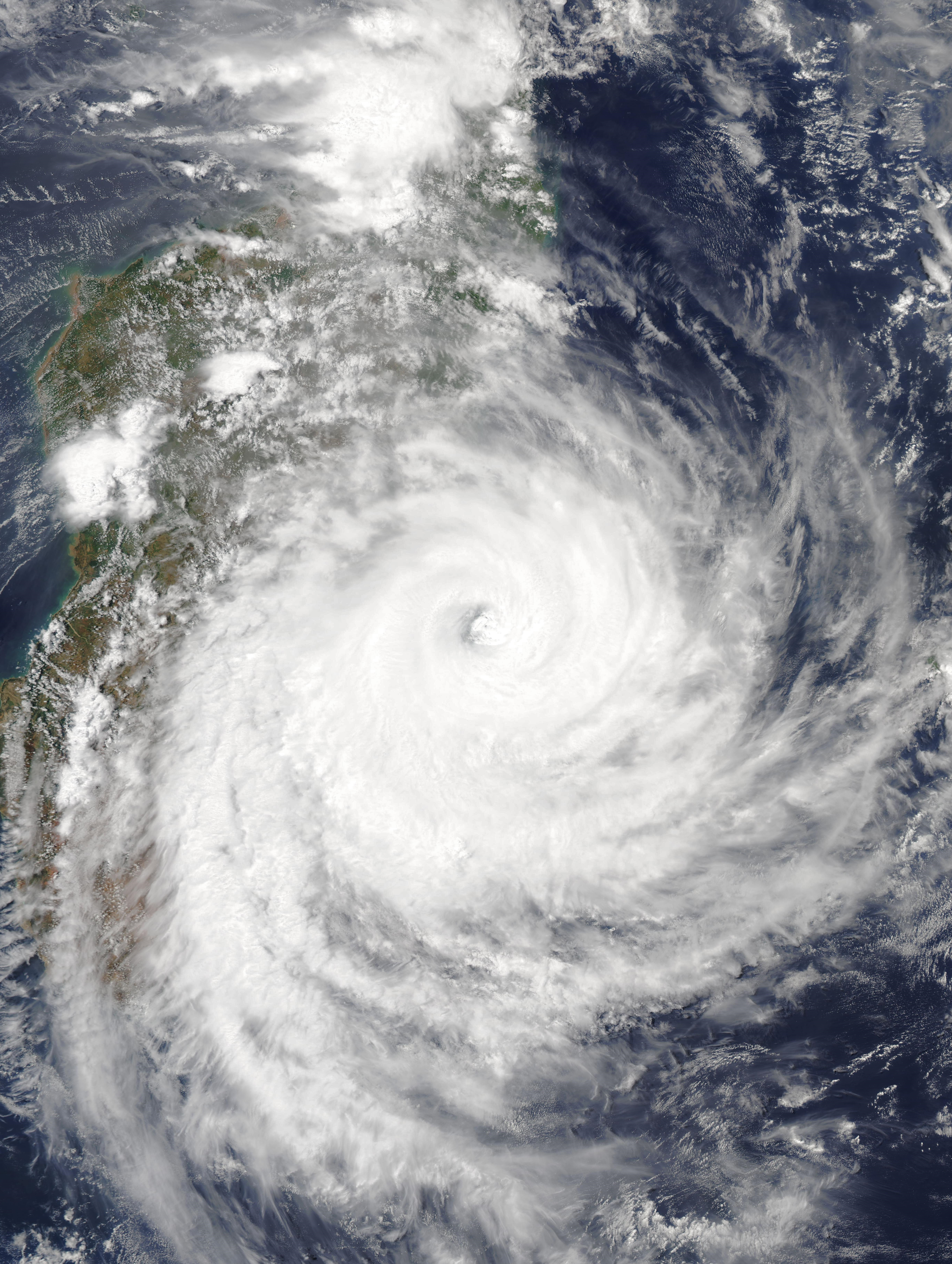
Cyclone Batsirai shortly before landfall in Madagascar on 5 February

=== Mauritius ===
Along with the airport, all transport services were closed due to the impact. Wind gusts reached 155 km/h (96 mph), and rain totalled 180 mm (7 in) in other areas of the island country. Two deaths were reported. Trees had been uprooted in many areas, and at least 7,500 homes faced power outages. A total of 138 people sought refuge in evacuation centers. The Mahébourg waterfront was damaged by large waves, with several chairs and tables swept into the sea. Local economist estimated the loss countrywide to be Rs1.4 billion (US$32.1 million).

=== Réunion ===
At least 36,000 people on the island lost power as Batsirai approached, with 10,000 still out on 7 February. Several people were injured, with the storm causing carbon monoxide poisoning in 10 people. Eleven sailors were stranded in an oil tanker during the storm, and were rescued on 4 February. Agricultural losses were estimated at €47 million (US$53.1 million).

=== Madagascar ===
Communication was sparse initially when the storm made landfall. Batsirai's conditions caused power outages and forced many people to move into shelters. Trees fell and power grids were knocked out, as well as homes were destroyed. At least 112,000 people were displaced by the storm, with 91,000 left homeless. Several houses had their roofs completely blown away, and many large coconut palm trees were blown over. Some houses were reduced to just wooden frames, and a survivor said the damage resembled a "fire", and that it was the "strongest cyclone [anyone] had experienced". Mananjary and Manakara were particularly heavy hit, with the former having at least 26,000 displaced alone, and had its hospital and prison damaged as well. A large portion of Madagascar was still waterlogged from Ana weeks earlier, and the arrival of Batsirai worsened the effects.

Nosy Varika was strongly damaged. An official described the damage as if they were "bombed", with 95% of buildings being reported as destroyed. Floods cut access to the town. Electric poles fell, and roofs were torn off in the city of Fianarantsoa, which was also heavily flooded. A landslide was caused by the cyclone in the region of Haute Matsiatra. Flooding and debris rendered 17 bridges and 17 roads impassable, as well as at least 69 classrooms completely destroyed, and 439 damaged; this left over 9,000 children unable to attend lessons, with 403 in Mananjary alone. After the storm passed, already flooded canals and rivers continued to rise. In Mananjary and surrounding areas, early reports indicated over 6,000 buildings were flooded, with half of them destroyed. The president of Madagascar, Andry Rajoelina, showed images of a church's metal roof twisted off, along other damage online after he visited Mananjary. Fruit trees and rice paddies were ripped and flooded in the town and other areas, hampering the harvest that was only two weeks away. The time it took to travel to the town by car was increased several days due to damage. Main roads linking the capital to smaller areas were cut off, making relief efforts even harder.

The UNHAS aerial flight discovered that Fitovinany region mostly suffered flooding damage; with several communities taking heavy hits to their agriculture and infrastructure. In total, over 17,100 homes were damaged, with 7,488 destroyed, 2,714 partially, and 6,978 flooded. 53 health centers were damaged, along with 6 destroyed. In Ikongo alone, 87 people died. Collapsing homes killed people in their sleep. A member of parliament representing the district also said that people also drowned in flooded areas there as well.

121 deaths were reported, including 13 children, with 5 being under 12 years of age.

== Aftermath ==
The amount of destruction is significant and for many this is only the beginning. The storm may have passed, but now the affected communities must restart from scratch—rebuilding their homes, schools and hospitals

— Vincent Dolanneau, Humanity & Inclusion's director for Madagascar, to ABC News.

=== Mauritius ===
A total of 454 people, in 182 affected families, sought shelter in 45 centers. They were all surveyed in order to give them the necessary help after the storm. The Minister of Social Integration, Social Security, and National Solidarity, Mrs. Fazila Jeewa-Daureeawoo, made the announcement about the procedure on 7 February.

=== Madagascar ===
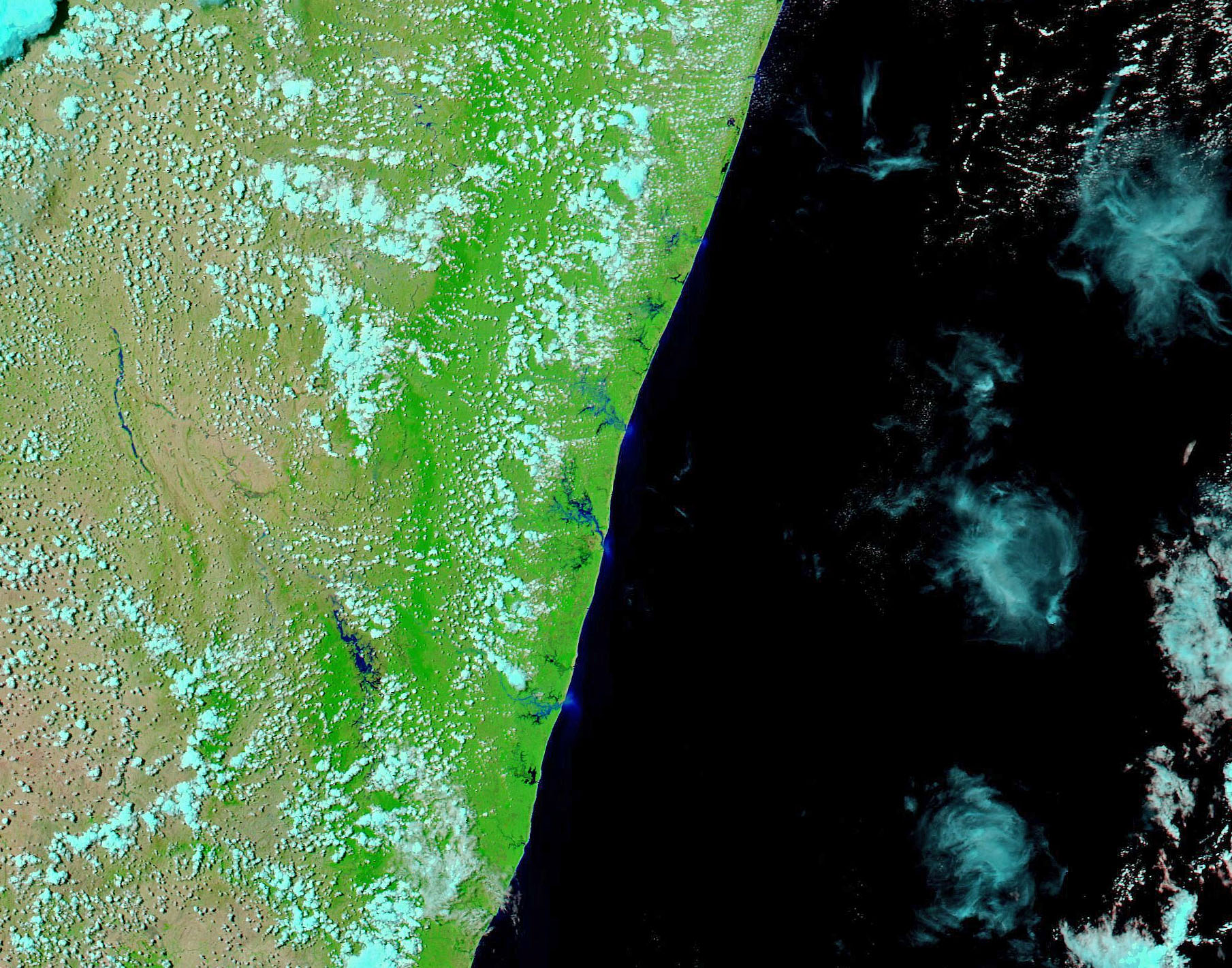
False-color satellite imagery of flooding in Madagascar on 10 February

The impacts of Tropical Storm Ana were compounded by the damage that Batsirai brought.

Schools and churches prepared to shelter those displaced around Mananjary. World Food Programme distributed hot meals to 4,000 evacuated and displaced people in shelters. Drinking water and basic necessities were lacking in impacted areas, and the spreading of several diseases was also a concern. A humanitarian crisis was also feared to rise out of the storm's effects. Aerial rescue effort first took place on 6 February via an UNHAS flight. The Malagasy government provided households affected with monetary donations. UNICEF also supported relief efforts by giving out kits to create child-friendly spaces in several regions of the country. Other measures were taken to help decrease incidents inside of shelters as well. A team that initially consisted of five EU Civil Protection officials from France, Finland, and Sweden traveled to affected areas to help victims of the storm.

The PRIOI had deployed 87 tons of humanitarian material from its warehouses in the country to use for relief efforts, an effort that cost approximately €667,000. An estimated 75,000 people—including 37,500 children—were in need of relief assistance after Batsirai. WASH partners delivered items to Vatovavy, Fitovinany, and Atsimo Atisinanana regions.

==== International response ====
France and Germany have offered water purification modules via the EU Civil Protection Mechanism.

== See also ==
- Tropical cyclones in 2022
- Weather of 2022
- List of South-West Indian Ocean intense tropical cyclones
- Tropical cyclones in the Mascarene Islands
- Cyclone Honorinina (1986) – cyclone that struck eastern Madagascar in March 1986.
- Cyclone Geralda (1994) – a powerful tropical cyclone that caused catastrophic damage in Madagascar
- Cyclone Giovanna (2012) – cyclone that had a similar path and intensity and occurred exactly ten years prior
- Cyclone Emnati (2022) – Powerful storm which struck the same areas three weeks later
- Cyclone Freddy (2023) – A powerful and long lived cyclone which also affected the same areas a year later
- Climate change in Madagascar
