= Maternity Hospital =

A maternity hospital is a hospital for the care of newborns and of mothers giving birth.

Maternity Hospital as a name may mean:

- Ripley Memorial Hospital (Minneapolis, Minnesota), a former hospital, named "Maternity Hospital" from 1886 founding to sometime in the 20th century
- Brooklyn Hebrew Maternity Hospital, in New York, formerly known as Maternity Hospital of Brownsville and East New York
- Florence Nightingale Maternity Hospital, in Johannesburg, formerly known as Maternity Hospital of Hillbrow
