= Aiton Court =

Historical apartment building in Hillbrow, South Africa

Coordinates: 26.1934°S 28.0463°E

Aiton Court is an architecturally significant apartment block, located in the neighbourhood of Hillbrow, South Africa. Designed by Angus Stewart and Bernard Cooke, in 1937, this block is considered a definitive example of "Hillbrow Modern", and follows Le Corbusier's principles.

Aiton Court is also significant as it was one of the first residential buildings in the bohemian flatlands of Johannesburg to become a racially diverse mixed neighbourhood, by ignoring the Group Areas Act. These attempts at desegregation also contributed to the greying of Johannesburg's inner-city.

Aiton Court's successful restoration also acts as an example of how market–led gentrification does not serve the public good. There are other routes by which low–income tenants' particular needs can also be aligned with a more nuanced approach that takes in the multiple factors that need to be aligned.

== Hillbrow and its architects ==
Hillbrow was originally established in 1895 as a residential and healthy suburb, positioned high above the dusty diggers' camps distinct from the city, with detached private houses. However, in 1946, height restrictions were removed in the suburb. During the 1950s and 1960, Hillbrow entered a rapid phase of construction and the familiar high-rise inner city neighbourhood was a result of a rapid post-war building boom during the fifties and sixties.

Modernism and the "precocious modern movement architects" and their ideals have transformed Johannesburg's spatial and social manifestations. This modernist apartment block was the work of Stewart and Cooke, pioneering architects and recent graduates of the School of Architecture at the University of the Witwatersrand. Le Corbusier also coined a name for these modernist architects, the Transvaal-groep (or le Groupe Transvaal). Aiton Court was economically constructed from building materials that were cheap and easily available. The repetitive architectural elements in Aiton Court served the architects, developers and investors well, with the post-war housing boom. The building should be seen as an example of speculative development, with new capital being developed by changes in land use.

Later, as more development took place, smaller buildings like Aiton Court were dwarfed by larger high rise buildings. These newly constructed flats, run by corporate owners and their agents, would diminish the capital reserves of families, who financed the building with monies invested in South African brick-and-mortar developments instead of risky European investments.

== Building layout ==
The block consisted of two parallel buildings separated by a courtyard with an entrance foyer and a running fountain. There are 25 one-room flats and 18 single rooms. There are three floors of flats in the front, with a rooftop courtyard. There are four floors of flats at the back, with three floors of single rooms above. Servants' quarters are on the roof. This was fitted onto a 483 sq. m property.

== Recent history ==
In the 1980s, Aiton Court would be one of the first residential buildings to begin the process of desegregation, with inner-city greying, anti-apartheid activism and Hillbrow becoming racially mixed. Neglect, sub-letting, overcrowding, and inadequate maintenance led to tenant flight and hijacked buildings as Hillbrow became under-regulated.

== Restoration and repair ==
Rent control and decentralization of the city have left this block of flats, like many other modernist buildings, in need of repair and restoration. Endemic decay led to hijacked buildings and an urban slum. Aiton Court was sold in 2010 to a commercial company, Trafalgar Property Management. Aiton Court was restored by Mayat Hart Architects. The new building owners faced the challenge of balancing restoration, conservation and commercial realities. Priority was given to the restoration of public spaces which add greater value to the residents. Their work led to recognition from the Gauteng Institute for Architecture (GIFA) and the "Herbert Prins Colosseum Award" for small scale buildings.
