= Pazigyi massacre =

2023 killing of civilians by the Myanmar Air Force

Coordinates: 23°00′16″N 95°55′15″E

- Part of the Myanmar civil war
- Pazigyi massacre (Myanmar)
- Location: Pazigyi, Sagaing Region
- Date: 11 April 2023
- Deaths: ≥165
- Injuries: 30
- Perpetrator: Myanmar Air Force

On 11 April 2023, the Myanmar Air Force massacred at least 165 people in the village of Pazigyi, Kantbalu Township, which is located 92 miles (148 km) west of Mandalay, Myanmar's second largest city. The air force used fighter jets and helicopters to attack a large crowd of people gathering for the opening of a local office of an opposition movement. The Pazigyi attack was the junta's deadliest attack since seizing power in the 2021 coup d'état.

== Background ==
On 1 February 2021, the Myanmar Armed Forces staged a coup d'état and deposed the democratically elected government led by the National League for Democracy. Shortly after, the military established a junta, the State Administration Council (SAC), and declared a national state of emergency. In response, civilians throughout the country staged large-scale protests resisting the military coup.

By May 2021, the civilian-led resistance had escalated into a civil war against the SAC, who was unwilling to compromise. Pazigyi is situated in the traditional Bamar Buddhist heartland, which quickly emerged as a stronghold of resistance against military rule. Pazigyi is a small farming village of approximately 233 households, located in the Sagaing Region, which borders the country's second-largest city, Mandalay.

In early April 2023, Myanmar Army troops launched a military offensive in Sagaing Region, where Pazigyi is located, to intimidate and suppress local resistance. The Myanmar Army burned and raided villages and murdered villagers, driving thousands of people from their homes. By 23 February, 14 of the 50 townships placed under martial law were located in Sagaing Region.

== Incident ==
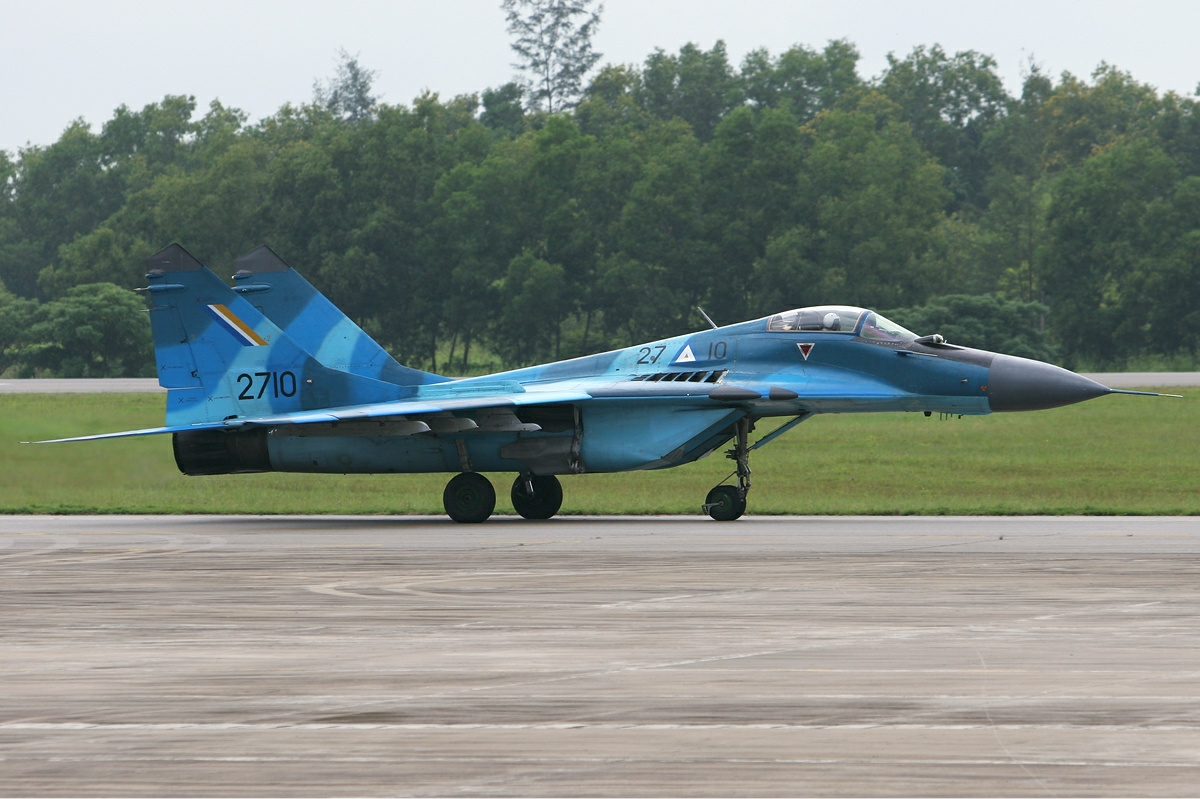
A Myanmar Air Force Mikoyan MiG-29, like the aircraft used in the bombing of Pazigyi.

On 11 April 2023, over 800 villagers gathered in Pazigyi to celebrate the opening of an administration office of the People's Defence Force (an armed group opposed to the military government), where food and tea were offered. The event coincided with the third day of Burmese New Year celebrations. During the celebration, a fighter jet bombed the area, detonating nearby munitions. Shortly thereafter, a helicopter fired indiscriminately on targets below. The air raid resulted in the death of at least 165 people and injured another 30. Many of the victims were women and children.

Later, at 17:23 MMT, an Mi-35 helicopter that had taken off from an air force base located in Tada-U launched a second attack on Pazigyi village.

Later in the evening, the junta's spokesperson, Major General Zaw Min Tun, confirmed that the strike had happened, but he did not reveal how many people had been killed.

The victims included 34 children, and many of the bodies were dismembered and burnt beyond identification. The air-strike killed two to four members of every family in the village, according to a People's Defence Force battalion spokesperson.

== Reactions ==
=== International response ===
Secretary-General of the United Nations António Guterres issued a statement on 11 April in which he strongly condemned the attack and demanded that those responsible be held accountable. United Nations Special Rapporteur on the Situation of Human Rights in Myanmar Tom Andrews stated, "The Myanmar military's attacks against innocent people, including today's airstrike in Sagaing, is enabled by world indifference and those supplying them with weapons."

ASEAN issued a statement on April 13 condemning the attack, stating that "All forms of violence must end immediately, particularly the use of force against civilians," and reiterated the five-point consensus agreed upon in April 2021.

The United States Department of State expressed deep concern over the airstrikes and called on the Myanmar government to put an end to the horrific violence. Japan's Chief Cabinet Secretary Hirokazu Matsuno strongly condemned the violence, and called for both the cessation of violence and restoration of democracy. Taiwan's Ministry of Foreign Affairs condemned the Burmese military's use of force, adding that it would worsen the domestic situation, and urged the regime to restore democracy. Both China and Russia refused to accept the draft resolution condemning the air strike.

France condemned the airstrike on the village and said that it would continue to stand firmly with the Myanmar people, whose courage and staunch commitment to democracy it applauded.

In a statement, the embassy of Canada to Myanmar stated: "Canada condemns the Myanmar regime's repeated, deliberate, widespread, indiscriminate and disproportionate use of force against civilians. The deliberate targeting of civilians is a violation of international humanitarian law.

Amnesty International called for an international suspension of aviation fuel imports to Myanmar.

=== Domestic response ===
The National Unity Government (NUG) has ordered that the flag of the People's Defense Force (PDF) be flown at half-mast to commemorate the victims of the military's air attacks.

The Committee Representing Pyidaungsu Hluttaw issued a statement that read "unless the international community takes decisive action against the terrorist army, countless Burmese citizens will continue to perish."

The NUG's Ministry of Defence has claimed that the air strike on Pazigyi village constitutes a war crime and has pledged to expel the military regime from Myanmar as swiftly as possible.

The NUG's foreign minister Zin Mar Aung announced that she would strive to secure justice for the village.

The Karenni State Consultative Council (KSCC) declared in a statement that the terrorist military council is engaging in mass air slaughters directed towards civilians, and emphasized the need for a concerted effort to fight against the military dictatorship with full force, to swiftly bring an end to their rule.

== See also ==
- List of massacres in Myanmar
- Hpakant massacre
