= Florence Nightingale Maternity Hospital =

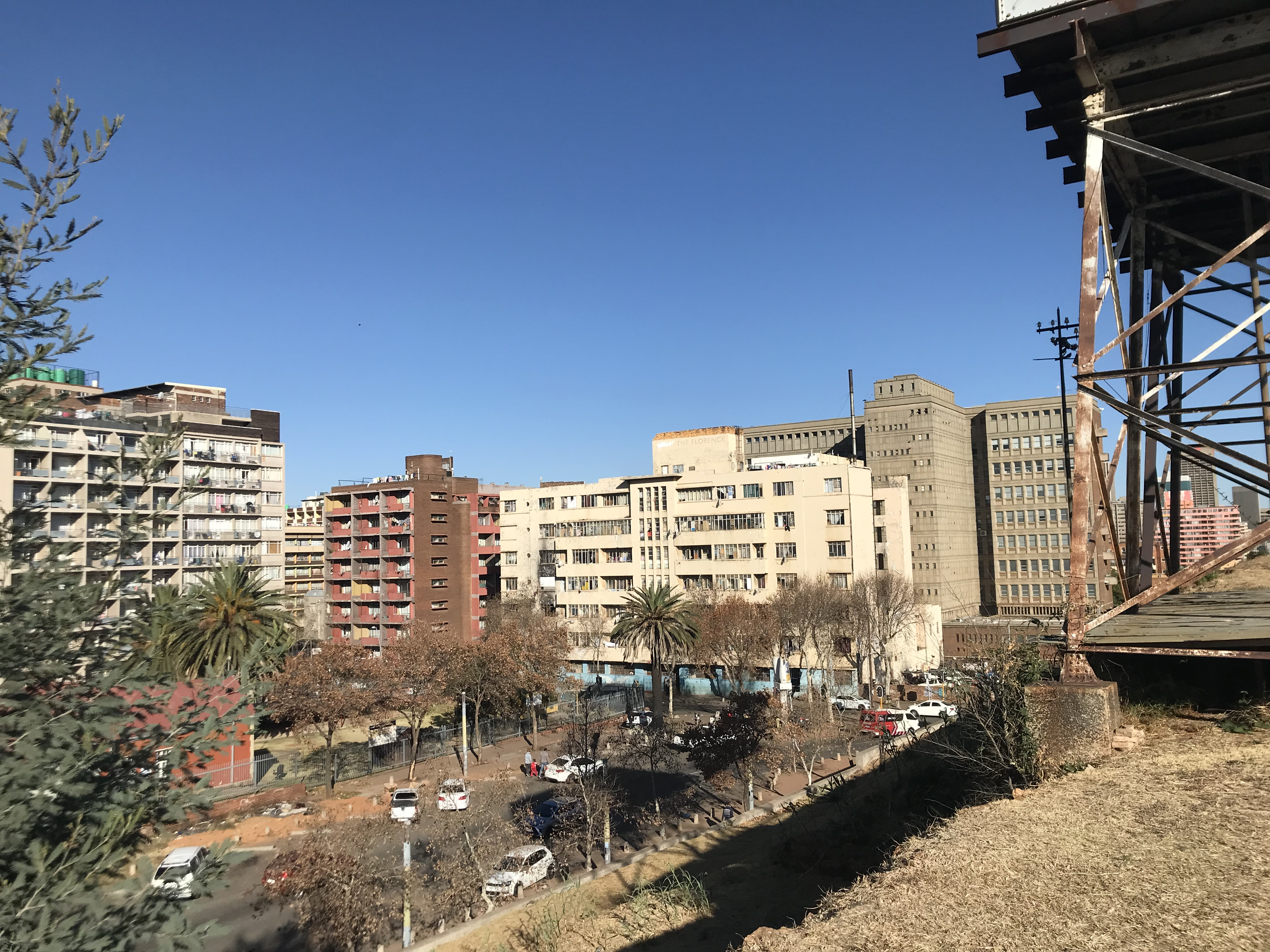

The Florence Nightingale Maternity Hospital is a defunct hospital. This building was once a private maternity hospital located in Hillbrow, Johannesburg, South Africa. Designed by H. Battiscombe in 1937 and built in the 1950s, the former hospital building can be found on the corner of Hospital and Kotze Street. At one time, this hospital offered maternity care to white women who lived in Johannesburg's most densely populated urban area. As of December 2025, the building is abandoned and occupied by the city's poorest inhabitants.

== Hospital closed ==
In the 1960s, The Florence was a part of Hillbrow's public and private ‘health precinct’. In the late 1970s, Hillbrow began to desegregate, and "White Flight" resulted in businesses shifting to the northern suburbs. With the demise of the Apartheid in the 1990s, the private medical facility was forced to shut its doors. Initially in 1998, the Florence was used to provide transitional housing to address a constitutional court obligation to offer shelter to evicted tenants. The building was bought in 2000 by an NGO, The Learn and Earn Trust, who had entrepreneurship ideals. In 2011, student architects from École nationale supérieure d'architecture de Toulouse visited the building and initiated a rehabilitation project that was based on existing resources. Later on, a paper was published suggesting a social division of the building into four equally sized neighborhoods with shared services, such as a day care center on the second floor, an improvised chapel in the basement, a music school, a communal laundry, and garbage chutes to simplify daily waste management. The trust did not achieve their sustainability goals, and in 2013, a trustee was stabbed to death, allegedly by building hijackers over eviction notices. The building was abandoned by the trust in 2016. Further disrepair followed, and the city of Johannesburg faced another hijacked building.

== Renewal ==
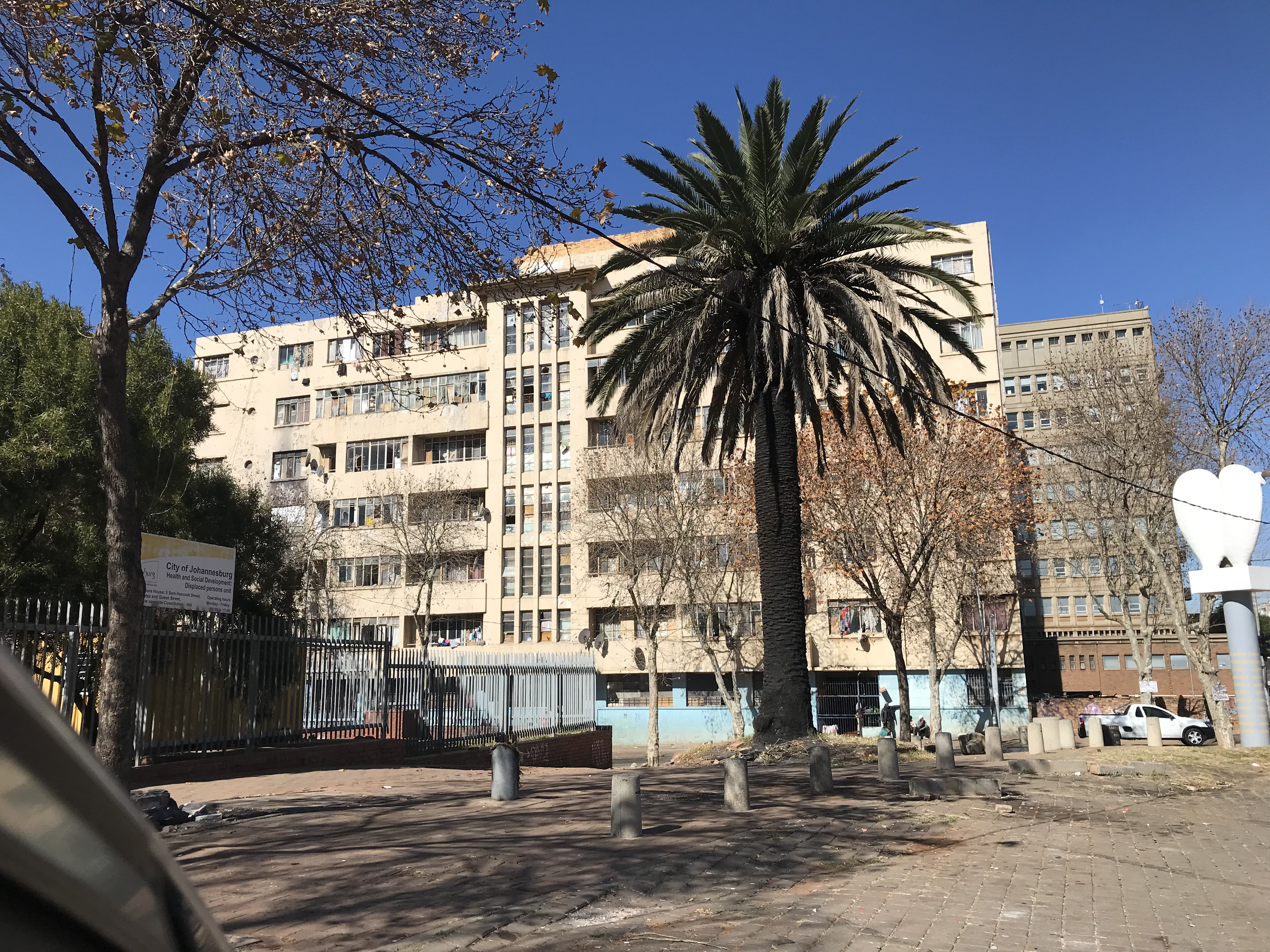
Florence Nightingale Maternity Hospital June 2025

Plans for renewal of the building were announced by The People SA, another non profit organization working with the local community to support Florence House, and the Malaika Orphanage. Privately owned waste management group Averda assisted The People SA, with phase one of the transformation of The Florence Nightingale.

== Spatial Changes in Hillbrow ==
The Florence fit into the surrounding area, known as “Hospital Hill”, or the Hillbrow Health Precinct (HHP). According to the Joburg Development Agency, both public and private health facilities were supposed to be combined. Medical facilities in the area have included the Old Johannesburg General Hospital, Charlotte Maxeke, Donald Gordon Medical Centre, Brenthurst and Park Lane Clinics, and the Wits Medical School. Phase two and three, where complete community upliftment is realized, have not been implemented. The Florence Nightingale Maternity Hospital is no more and the Florence has been designated as a dark building and a fire hazard.
