= 2023 Johannesburg building fire =

Deadly blaze in South Africa

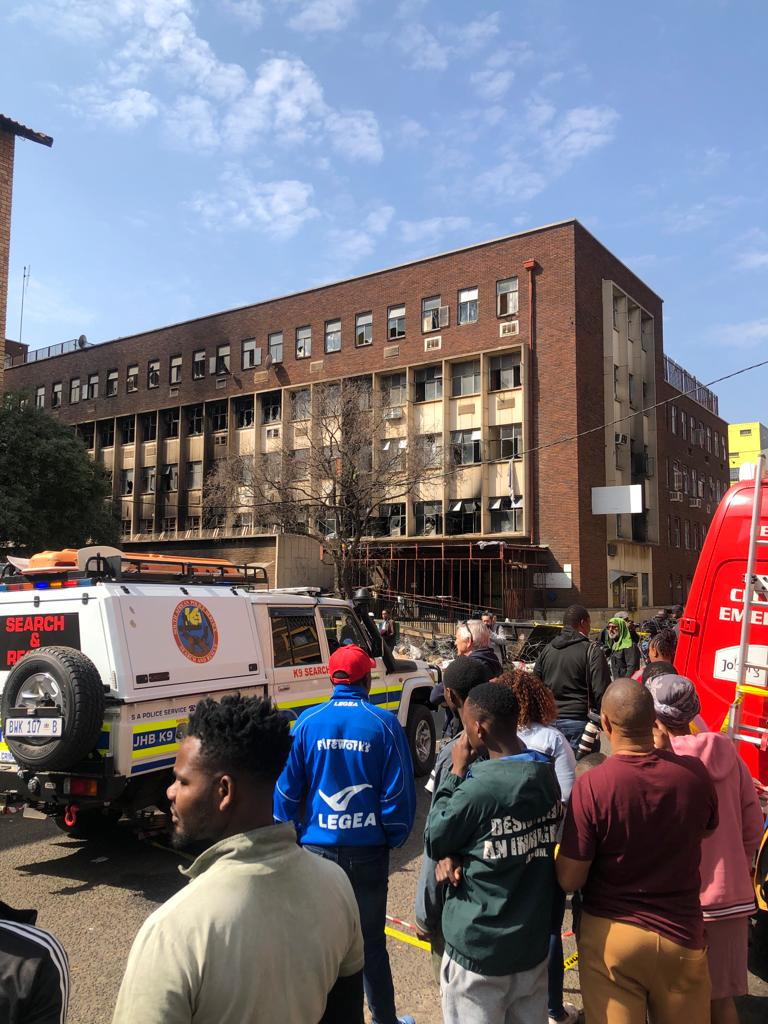
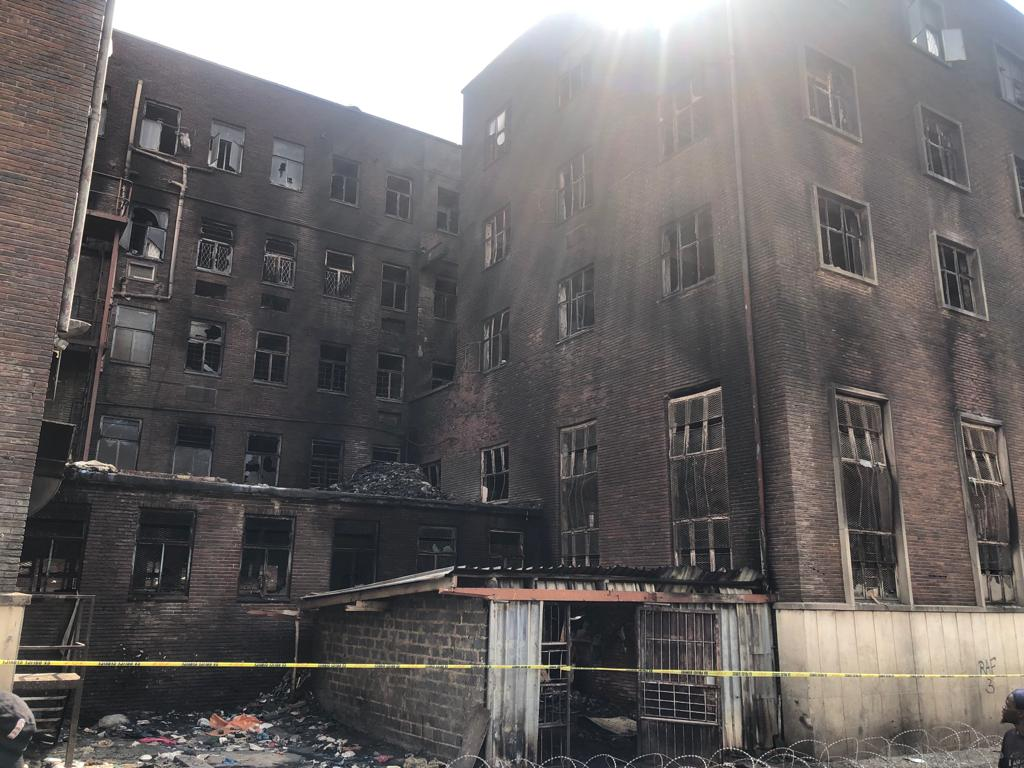
- Front and back of the building following the fire
- Date: 31 August 2023; 2 years ago
- Time: 01:30 SAST
- Location: 80 Albert Street, Marshalltown, Johannesburg, South Africa; 26°12′30″S 28°02′57″E
- Deaths: 77 (Note: some reports say 76 were killed, a man has also been charged with 76 counts of murder and not 77)
- Injuries: 88

On 31 August 2023 at around 01:30 SAST, a fire engulfed an illegally occupied government-owned building in Johannesburg, South Africa; 77 people were killed and 88 others were injured. It was one of the deadliest fires in South African history.

== The building ==
The building, 80 Albert Street, was built in 1954 as the head office of Johannesburg's Non-European Affairs Department, serving as a Pass Office for enforcing pass laws controlling the movement of black people into Johannesburg under the apartheid system. From 1994, the building housed a women's shelter later called the Usindiso Women's Shelter. In 2019, a clinic housed in the building was relocated by the member of the Mayoral Committee (MMC) for Health and Social Development, Mpho Phalatse, as the building was occupied by squatters and found to be unsafe.

The building is marked with a heritage plaque narrating its history.

== Fire ==
The fire broke out in the early hours of the morning on 31 August 2023, in the Central Business District, at a five-storey abandoned building on the corner of Delvers and Albert Streets that is owned by the city government and was taken over by gangs. It was being illegally occupied by as many as 400 impoverished people—many of them foreign nationals, economic migrants, and asylum seekers—all of whom were being charged rent by the gangs. The cause of the fire is not currently known. It spread through the building, trapping many people due to flimsy partitions and gates between makeshift rooms constructed by residents.

Many residents jumped from the windows of the building to escape, some of whom did not survive the jump. Firefighters found bodies piled up where they had died at a locked gate on the ground floor while trying to exit the burning building.

== Aftermath ==
The fire brought attention to the hundreds of hijacked buildings in the Johannesburg CBD, typically overcrowded and unregulated and inhabited by impoverished and marginalised people including a large number of undocumented migrants to South Africa's economic hub of Johannesburg.

Some residents who survived the fire refused to board buses for relocation to emergency accommodation in community halls after the fire, fearing the relocation would be used by officials as an excuse for deportation, and being unwilling to leave behind the remains of their possessions in the burnt building.

In January 2024, a 29-year-old man was arrested after he confessed to starting the fire. The man said he started the fire in order to get rid of another murder victim's body on the orders of a Tanzanian drug dealer who also lived in the building. He is currently facing 76 counts of murder and 120 counts of attempted murder. In September 2025, The man, who has since been identified as Sthembiso Mdlalose, said he was in the building but didn't start the fire. Later that same month, Mdlalose, who is now on trial, recanted his previous statement saying he was nowhere near the building when the fire occurred and was instead sleeping on the street.

== Response ==
President Cyril Ramaphosa visited the site of the tragedy on 31 August, calling it a "wake-up call". Gauteng Premier Panyaza Lesufi announced an inquiry into the fire. While government officials blamed the crisis on NGOs, who prevented the previous attempts to evict occupiers from similar properties, NGOs and inner city property owners argued that it was the duty of the City of Johannesburg to maintain buildings, provide services and enforce safety regulations. South Africa's courts have consistently ruled that evictions cannot proceed unless alternative housing is provided under the provisions of the 1998 Prevention of Illegal Eviction Act. Following the fire, the City attempted to disconnect illegal electricity connections from similar hijacked buildings in the city, but was met with strong resistance from residents.

== See also ==
- 2023 Hanoi building fire, another large residential fire two weeks later
