= Hijacked buildings in South Africa =

Illegally occupied buildings in South Africa

Hijacked buildings in South Africa are abandoned or vacant buildings that have been illegally occupied by individuals or groups, often criminal syndicates. The phenomenon is particularly common in Johannesburg and Durban, where there are an estimated 200 large hijacked buildings and 250 private dwellings.

Most hijacked buildings are often in a dilapidated state, with no running water, electricity, or sanitation. They can be dangerous places to live, with high rates of crime and fire and it's one of the factors cited during the 2023 Johannesburg building fire. Despite this, many people live in hijacked buildings because they cannot afford other housing options.

== History ==
The problem began during white flight at the end of apartheid in 1994, as big businesses moved out of the inner city into affluent suburbs, and the city experienced an influx of African migrants and South Africans seeking economic opportunities, this caused a housing crisis in South Africa's largest cities: Johannesburg and Durban.

Criminal syndicates started hijacking buildings that were left empty and renting them out illegally. They quickly became dilapidated centres of drugs crime and other lawlessness.

=== Impact ===
Hijacked buildings have a number of negative impacts on communities. They can lead to increased crime, decreased property values, and a decline in the quality of life for residents. Hijacked buildings can also be a fire hazard, as they often lack basic safety features.

In addition, hijacked buildings can be a breeding ground for disease. The lack of sanitation and running water can lead to the spread of waterborne diseases such as cholera and typhoid.

=== Countermeasures ===
The city of Johannesburg has outlined a number of counter measure to address the problem of hijacked buildings. These include:

- Providing more affordable housing options for people who are living in hijacked buildings.
- Investing in the revitalization of inner cities, which can make them more attractive to businesses and residents.
- Cracking down on criminal syndicates that are involved in the hijacking of buildings.
- Enforcing the Prevention of Illegal Eviction and Unlawful Occupation of Land Act more effectively.

== See also ==
- Law and Disorder in Johannesburg - a 2008 documentary by Louis Theroux which features a hijacked building
