= Pazigyi =

Pazigyi ပဇီကြီး
- Village
- Location in Myanmar (Burma)
- Coordinates: 23°00′16″N 95°55′15″E
- Country: Myanmar
- Region: Sagaing Region
- District: Kanbalu District
- Township: Kanbalu Township
- Village tract: Pazigyi village tract
- Time zone: UTC+6.30 (MMT)
- Postal code: 005001

Pazigyi (Burmese: ပဇီကြီး) is a village and village tract in Kanbalu Township, Sagaing Region, Myanmar.

== Massacre ==
On 11 April 2023, the Myanmar Air Force launched an airstrike at the opening ceremony of the People's Administration Office in Pazigyi village, killing at least 170 villagers. In the attack, a fighter jet dropped bombs on a gathering of protesters against Myanmar's military junta. Afterwards, a helicopter, possibly an Mi-35, fired indiscriminately on civilians.
