= Meteorological history of Cyclone Freddy =

Cyclone Freddy
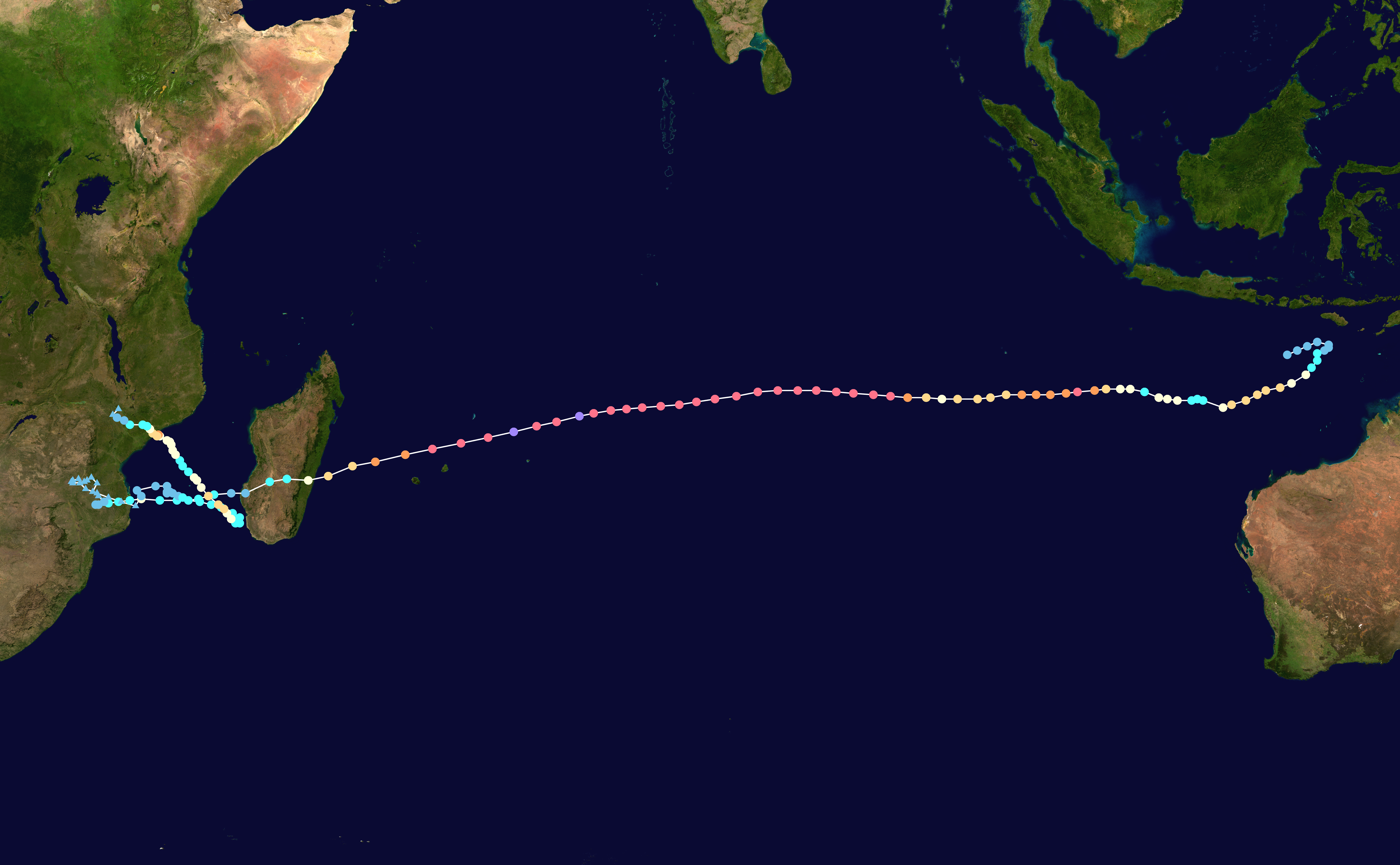
- Track of Cyclone Freddy, according to the Saffir-Simpson scale

Meteorological history
- Formed: 4 February 2023
- Dissipated: 14 March 2023
- Duration: 5 weeks and 3 days (Longest-lasting tropical system on record)

Very intense tropical cyclone
- 10-minute sustained (MFR)
- Highest winds: 230 km/h (145 mph)
- Lowest pressure: 927 hPa (mbar); 27.37 inHg

Category 5-equivalent tropical cyclone
- 1-minute sustained (SSHWS/JTWC)
- Highest winds: 260 km/h (160 mph)
- Lowest pressure: 923 hPa (mbar); 27.26 inHg

Overall effects
- Areas affected: Mascarene Islands; Madagascar; Mozambique; Zimbabwe; Malawi; South Africa; Eswatini; Zambia
- Part of the 2022–23 Australian region and South-West Indian Ocean cyclone seasons
- History • Meteorological history Response • Humanitarian response Other wikis • Commons: Freddy images

Cyclone Freddy was the longest-lived tropical cyclone, lasting five weeks and three days, surpassing the previous record holder, 1994's Hurricane John. It also had the second-highest accumulated cyclone energy, a metric used to measure tropical cyclone activity, ever recorded worldwide. It also featured a record six separate rounds of rapid intensification during February and March 2023.

Freddy originated from a tropical low south of the Indonesian archipelago early on 4 February. Deep convection soon developed, and the system intensified Category 1 tropical cyclone on the Australian scale on 6 February. Located just within Tropical Cyclone Warning Centre Melbourne's area of responsibility, the storm was named Freddy—the third named storm of the 2022–23 Australian region cyclone season—by the Australian Bureau of Meteorology. As it moved westward across the Indian Ocean, Freddy quickly intensified and became a Category 4 severe tropical cyclone before it moved into the area of responsibility of Météo-France La Réunion. As the second very intense tropical cyclone of the 2022–23 South-West Indian Ocean cyclone season. Freddy peaked with 10-minute sustained winds of 230 km/h (145 mph) and a central barometric pressure of 927 hPa (27.37 inHg). It quickly strengthened, reaching 1-minute sustained winds of 260 km/h (160 mph), making it a Category 5-equivalent intensity on the Saffir–Simpson scale.

After briefly weakening from its peak intensity, the cyclone moved toward the northern Mascarene Islands. It then developed a pinhole eye while approaching Madagascar as a compact tropical cyclone. The cyclone then made landfall as a strong Category 2-equivalent intensity with 1-minute sustained winds of 175 km/h (110 mph) near Mananjary, Madagascar on 21 February. This made Freddy the strongest storm to impact the island nation since Cyclone Batsirai a year earlier. It weakened further as it moved overland but regained strength upon reaching the Mozambique Channel. The cyclone intensified into a severe tropical storm and then passed north of Europa Island. The cyclone then made its second landfall near Vilankulos, Mozambique, as a moderate tropical storm status on 24 February. Upon re-entering the channel early on 1 March, it began regaining tropical characteristics and meandering along the Madagascar coast. It then intensified into a tropical cyclone with winds of about 175 km/h (110 mph) before making its final landfall near Quelimane, Mozambique on 11 March. Thereafter, it gradually weakened and dissipated late on 14 March.

== Formation and intensification ==
On 4 February 2023, the Australian Bureau of Meteorology (BoM) (Note: The Tropical Cyclone Warning Centre in Melbourne, Australia, is a branch of the country's Bureau of Meteorology, which is the official Regional Specialized Meteorological Center for the Australian basin.) reported that a tropical low—identified as 13U—had formed during an active phase of the Madden–Julian oscillation in conjunction with an equatorial Rossby wave, while it was situated to the south of the Indonesian archipelago. Soon after, the United States Joint Typhoon Warning Center (JTWC) (Note: While not designated by the World Meteorological Organization as a Regional Specialized Meteorological Center, the JTWC issues warnings on tropical cyclones in all of the major tropical cyclone basins to supplement the activities of United States government agencies.) issued a tropical cyclone formation alert, noting that the disturbance was located in a favorable environment with low wind shear and sea surface temperatures of 29–30 °C (84–86 °F). Early on 6 February, the JTWC began issuing warnings on the system, classifying it as Tropical Cyclone 11S. Deep convection increased and the system became a Category 1 tropical cyclone on the Australian scale by 12:00 UTC; the BoM assigned it the name Freddy accordingly. During this stage, sea surface temperatures reached 29.17 °C (84.51 °F), the warmest recorded for Freddy.

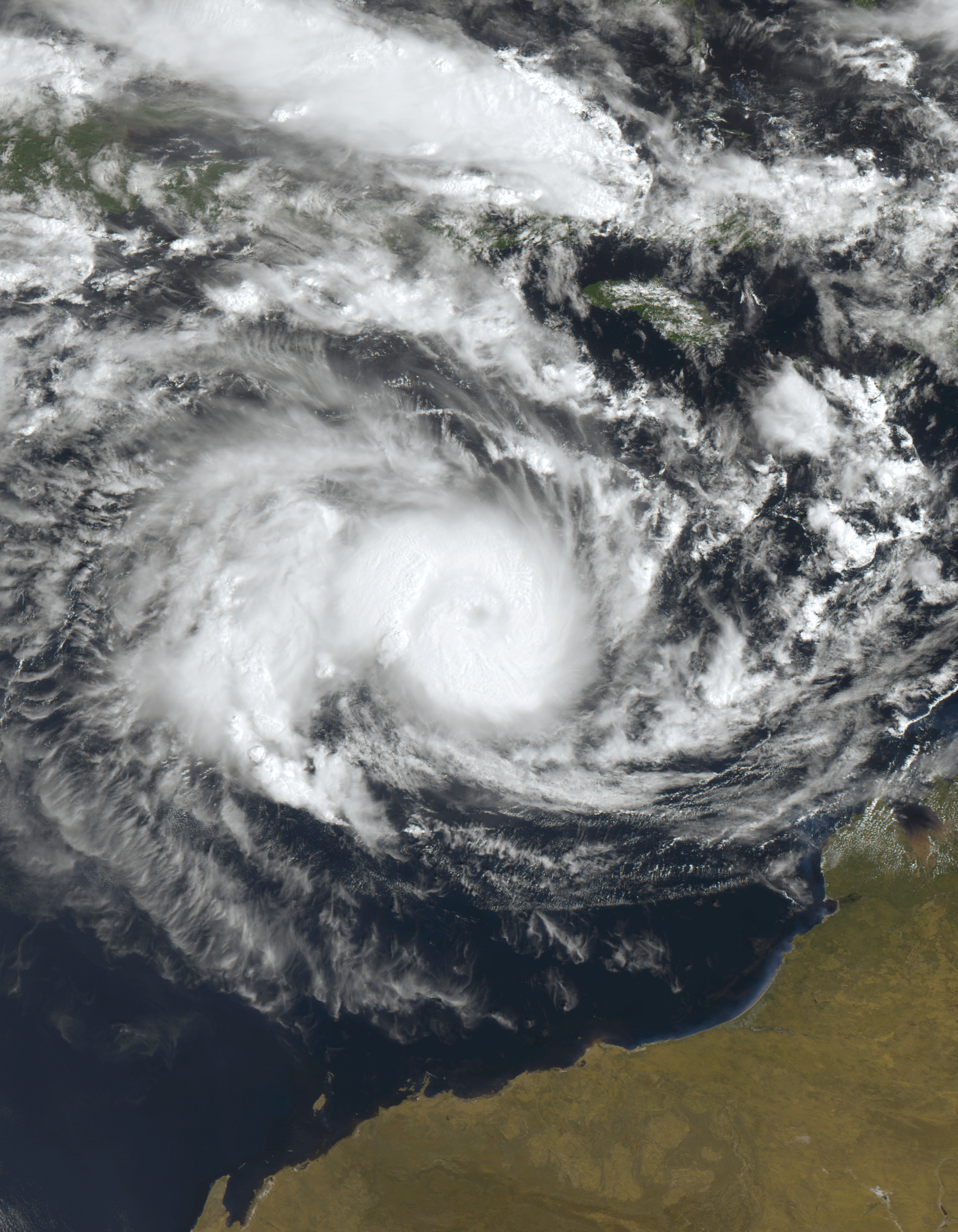
Freddy intensifying off the coast of Western Australia on 7 February

Freddy then rapidly intensified and developed an eye feature on microwave imagery. As a result, the JTWC classified it as a Category 2-equivalent intensity on the Saffir-Simpson scale around 15:00 UTC on 7 February. After its first peak, the system became increasingly susceptible to wind shear and dry air intrusion, causing Freddy to weaken back into a minimal tropical storm by 09:00 UTC on 9 February. Freddy's deep convection around the storm's center had significantly decreased. At 22:00 UTC that same day, Radarsat-1 revealed Freddy had stronger winds of 50 m/s (160 ft/s) centered under the central dense overcast, suggesting that the storm was experiencing weaker shear. Atmospheric conditions became more favorable for development as wind shear decreased and deep convection began to consolidate and wrap around the cyclone. Consequently, the cyclone quickly restrengthened with the storm becoming a Category 3 severe tropical cyclone—attaining an initial peak intensity with winds of 150 km/h (90 mph)—and at 18:00 UTC on 11 February, Freddy reached its second peak intensity as a high-end Category 4 severe tropical cyclone in the Australian basin, with winds of 175 km/h (110 mph) and a central barometric pressure of 951 hPa (28.08 inHg). The cyclone's eyewall displayed cloud tops warming to below −130 °F (−90 °C) while passing over warm sea surface temperature of 29 °C (84 °F). The cyclone's structure continued to gradually weaken before moving over the South-West Indian Ocean. At around 12:00 UTC on 14 February, the BoM passed the responsibility of tracking the system over to the Météo-France office on La Réunion (MFR). (Note: Météo-France's meteorological office in Réunion (MFR) is the official Regional Specialized Meteorological Center for the South-West Indian Ocean, tracking all tropical cyclones south of the equator, from the east coast of Africa to 90° E.) Thus, the system was initially classified as a tropical cyclone status before being later upgraded to intense tropical cyclone status around 18:00 UTC that day.

=== Forecast errors ===
The BoM issued forecast tracks for Freddy from 06:00 UTC on 6 February to 06:00 UTC on 14 February. Verification was performed using the BoM Official Forecast Tracks at the standard times of 00:00, 06:00, 12:00, and 18:00 UTC. Guidance from models on Freddy's intensity—particularly from the preferred European Centre for Medium-Range Weather Forecasts model—was inaccurate, which led to large forecast errors in intensity. The forecast failed to capture the rate or timing of the first period of rapid intensification between 6 and 8 February. From 8 February, it did not capture the subsequent weakening of Freddy, and from 10 February, it failed to predict the cyclone's re-intensification.

=== Interaction with Dingani ===
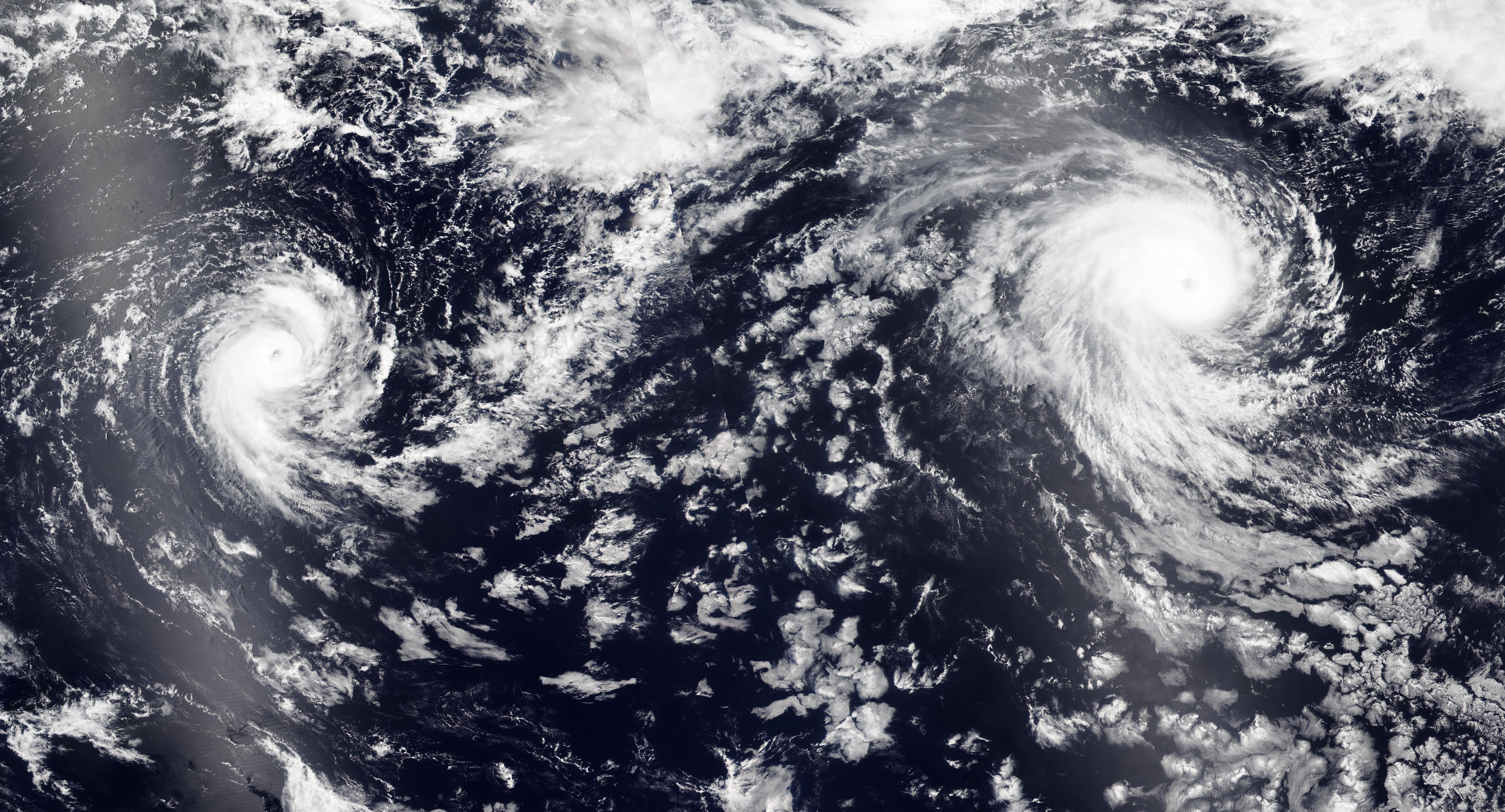
Cyclone Dingani (left) and Freddy (right) over the open Indian Ocean on 12 February.

The BoM reported that Tropical Low 11U developed near the Australian Area of Responsibility boundary on 3 February 2023, and moved west toward the Cocos Islands. It then entered the South-West Indian Ocean on 9 February, where it was designated as Moderate Tropical Storm Dingani by the MFR. By 12 February, Dingani had intensified into a tropical cyclone, maintaining a well-defined eye for twelve hours before shear caused it to disappear. On 15 February, Dingani transitioned into a post-tropical depression. During their coexistence, the average distance between Freddy and Dingani was 2,383 km (1,481 mi).

In March 2023, the head of operations at MFR stated that there might have been an indirect influence from Dingani, which strengthened the subtropical ridge to the east of Dingani and guided Freddy on a westward path across the Indian Ocean. He added that further research would be needed to confirm these findings. According to an October 2023 paper in the journal American Geophysical Union, Freddy's southwestward trajectory was influenced by a northerly steering flow, which resulted from its interaction with Cyclone Dingani to the west, while Perry et al 2024 showed that moisture advection during Dingani's passage helped fuel Freddy's movement, as moisture from Dingani was carried northeastward into the westerly jet stream and continued to affect Freddy until Dingani shifted southward on 13 February.

== The Mascarene Islands, Madagascar, and Mozambique ==
Cyclone Freddy approaching Mauritius on 19 February

Cyclone Freddy acquired annular characteristics on 14 February, bearing a symmetrical appearance and a well-defined 11.5 miles (18.5 km) wide pinhole eye, which was largely surrounded by central dense overcast. On 15 February at 03:00 UTC, the JTWC reported that the cyclone re-strengthened and underwent another period of rapid intensification, reaching Category 4-equivalent intensity. After maintaining Category 4 intensity for about 12 hours, Freddy weakened slightly before restrengthening to Category 5 intensity on 19 February, with the JTWC reporting 1-minute sustained winds of 260 km/h (160 mph). The cyclone's cloud tops warmed to −101 °F (−74 °C), causing the system to display annular characteristics. Additionally, the storm's eye expanded to a diameter of 29 miles (46 km). Concurrently, the cyclone was assigned a T7.0 rating via the Dvorak technique—a method of determining a tropical cyclone's intensity based on satellite appearance. Around 00:00 UTC that day, the MFR upgraded Freddy to a very intense tropical cyclone estimated a minimum barometric pressure of 931 hPa (27.49 inHg) and 10-minute sustained winds of 220 km/h (140 mph). However, in the best track for Freddy, the MFR concluded a peak wind speed of 230 km/h (145 mph), and minimum central pressure of 927 hPa (27.37 inHg). The cyclone then turned west-southwestward, along the northern edge of a mid-level subtropical high.

Cyclone Freddy tracks with IMERG precipitation (from 6 February to 12 March)

After reaching its peak intensity, the cyclone's eye pattern quickly deteriorated as the cloud tops warmed on 20 February, while it was traversing north of the Mascarene Islands. Later, an eyewall replacement cycle occurred, causing the storm to weaken. Late on 21 February, the cyclone developed a well-defined 7 miles (11 km) pinhole eye while approaching Madagascar as a compact tropical cyclone. Around 18:00 UTC that day, the cyclone made landfall near Mananjary, Madagascar, with the JTWC estimating winds of 175 km/h (110 mph). This made Freddy the strongest storm to impact the island nation since Cyclone Batsirai a year earlier. It then rapidly weakened upon encountering the mountainous terrain of the island nation and was downgraded to overland depression status. After crossing Madagascar, the cyclone's circulation became exposed, and deep convection was stripped away from the center on 22 February. Moving west-northwestward in response to a subtropical ridge to the west, Freddy emerged over the Mozambique Channel on 23 February. Afterwards, the cyclone's convection increased in the northern semicircle, and by around 06:00 UTC, Freddy had strengthened into a moderate tropical storm. Steered by a subtropical ridge to the south, the cyclone moved westward and quickly intensified into a severe tropical storm around 12:00 UTC that day, with convection wrapping around its center. An automated weather station on Europa Island indicated that Freddy had wind gusts up to 93–111 km/h (58–69 mph) after passing north of the island. Around 12:00 UTC on 24 February, the storm made landfall in Mozambique south of Vilankulos, with winds about 85 km/h (50 mph), just below severe tropical storm strength. It then rapidly weakened as it moved westward and further inland, eventually weakening to overland depression status around 18:00 UTC that day. The system's convective activity was concentrated in the southeastern semicircle over Mozambique on 25 February. Freddy's remnant low continued moving into Zimbabwe late on 26 February, where it stayed for a couple of days.

A May 2025 paper in Environmental Research reported that after landfall in Mozambique, Freddy was maintained overland by an upper-level anticyclone over the African continent that extended into the Mozambique Channel, enhancing outflow, and by a lower-level cyclonic inflow bringing warm, moist air.

== Redevelopment and dissipation ==
As early as 26 February, the MFR anticipated that a large low-pressure circulation associated with Freddy would move back toward the coast of Mozambique due to the influence of a trough over the southern Mozambique Channel and a near-equatorial ridge to the north. Projections from computer models also indicated that the system would redevelop into a tropical cyclone. Early on 1 March, Freddy emerged again into the channel—benefiting from favorable environmental conditions such as low vertical wind shear, good upper-level divergence, and sea surface temperatures of 28–29 °C (82–84 °F). The cyclone drifted slowly southward and struggled to intensify due to its broad circulation. At 06:00 UTC on 4 March, the MFR upgraded the system to a moderate tropical storm after an advanced scatterometer showed winds of 44 km/h (25 mph) in the southern semicircle. It was also noted that Freddy was tracking towards the eastward—under the increasing influence of the near-equatorial ridge to the north—as it developed a consolidating low-level circulation.

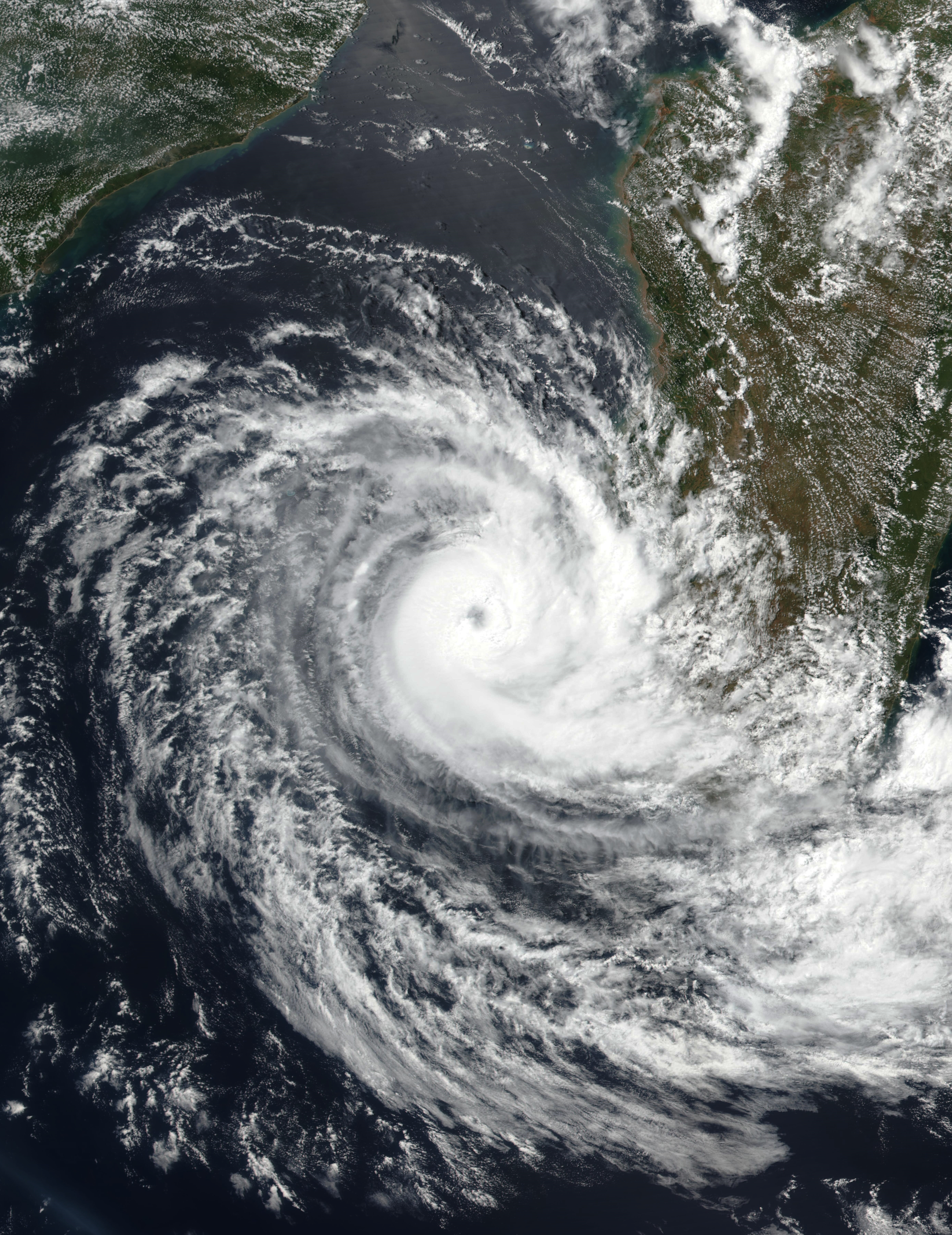
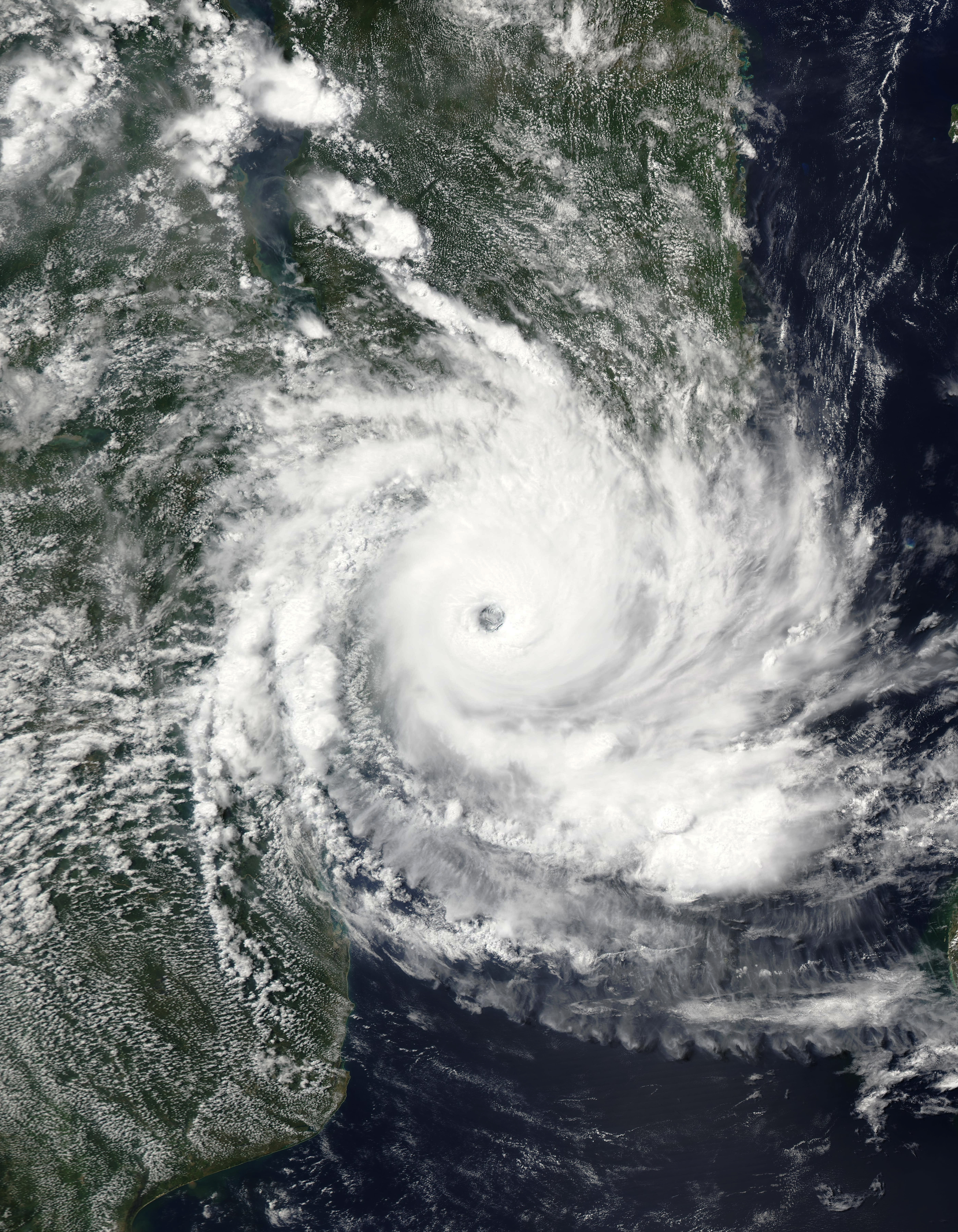
Freddy was intensifying off the coast of Madagascar on 7 March (left) and remained nearly stationary off the coast of Mozambique on 11 March (right).

The cyclone further intensified strengthened into a severe tropical storm status as it accelerated eastward toward the coast of Madagascar early on 5 March. Meandering along the Madagascar coast, the cyclone unexpectedly intensified—developing an ill-defined eye—which prompted the MFR to upgrade it to tropical cyclone status with sustained winds of 150 km/h (90 mph) by 12:00 UTC on 7 March. Freddy's eye disappeared from satellite imagery six hours later due to the effects of southern wind shear. The cyclone's motion accelerated and shifted northwestward under the northeastern side of the steering subtropical ridge early on 9 March. The cyclone rapidly weakened to slightly below minimal tropical storm strength due to increased wind shear and dry air intrusion. Despite this, the cyclone managed to steadily quickly—developing banding features. The cyclone rapidly re-strengthened and made landfall for the final time near Quelimane, Mozambique at 18:00 UTC on 11 March, with the JTWC estimated winds of about 175 km/h (110 mph)—featured a well-defined eye within its compact and symmetrical dense overcast. Within two hours, the eye of Freddy disappeared from satellite imagery, and it was estimated to have fallen below tropical cyclone status on 12 March. The JTWC described the cyclone as "a B-reel horror movie that never ends", and concluded, "It may not stay overland for long." The computer models predicted that the cyclone would turn eastward and re-emerge in the channel; however, it ultimately moved northwestward inland, bringing rain to Malawi and Mozambique before dissipating on 14 March.

== Records ==
Freddy's 36-day duration makes it the longest-lasting tropical cyclone to be recorded worldwide, in terms of the number of days maintaining tropical storm status or higher, surpassing Hurricane John's previous record of 31-days in the 1994 season. Additionally, Freddy was the second-farthest traveling tropical cyclone globally, covering a distance of 12,785 km (7,945 mi), which is approximately 33% of the Earth's circumference—just shy of 1994's Hurricane John, which covered 13,180 km (8,190 mi). The cyclone killed at least 1,434 people, making it the third deadliest tropical cyclone in the Southern Hemisphere, behind only 2019's Cyclone Idai and the 1973 Flores cyclone.

In addition, it had the second-highest accumulated cyclone energy— a metric used to measure the total energy generated by tropical cyclones—of any tropical cyclone worldwide, with a total of 83.31, just shy of Hurricane Ioke in 2006. Operationally, Freddy was the former holder of the highest accumulated cyclone energy, with a total of 87.01.

Freddy became the tropical cyclone that underwent six separate periods of rapid intensification, setting a record for the highest number of such events. A May 2025 paper reported that no other tropical cyclone in recorded history has experienced four or five periods of intensification. Further, it was one of only six systems to traverse the entirety of the southern Indian Ocean from east to west; the others were Cyclone Litanne in 1994 as well as Leon-Eline, Hudah in 2000, Dikeledi in 2025 and Grant in 2026.

=== Academic research ===
A May 2025 paper in Environmental Research reported that Freddy recorded the longest period of coastal activity of any tropical cyclone in the South Indian Ocean, lasting 37.25 days according to Joint Typhoon Warning Center data, which is close to the duration recorded in the Regional Specialized Meteorological Centre dataset.

A study by Ussalu and Manjate in October 2025 reported that Freddy progressed differently from earlier cyclones, including Chalane in 2020, Leon–Eline in 2000, Eloise in 2021, and Favio in 2007—which made landfall in Mozambique and did not turn back toward the Mozambique Channel—as well as Ernest in 2005, Gafilo in 2004, Dikeledi, and Jude in 2025, whose tracks continued through the Mozambique Channel toward southern Madagascar. The study stated that Freddy's multiple landfalls—twice in Madagascar and twice in Mozambique—are unprecedented, as no similar events have been recorded in the past five decades and with no record of anything similar occurring in the previous century. It also found that Freddy was the longest-lived tropical cyclone within Mozambique, lasting about 6.25 days.

== See also ==
- 1899 San Ciriaco hurricane – The longest-lived Atlantic hurricane and third-longest-lived tropical cyclone globally
- Cyclones Katrina and Victor–Cindy (1998) – An extremely long-lived tropical cyclone in the South Pacific that eventually regenerated into another cyclone in the Indian Ocean
- Hurricanes Dora in 1999 and in 2023 – Both tracked across all three north Pacific basins
