= List of South-West Indian Ocean intense tropical cyclones =

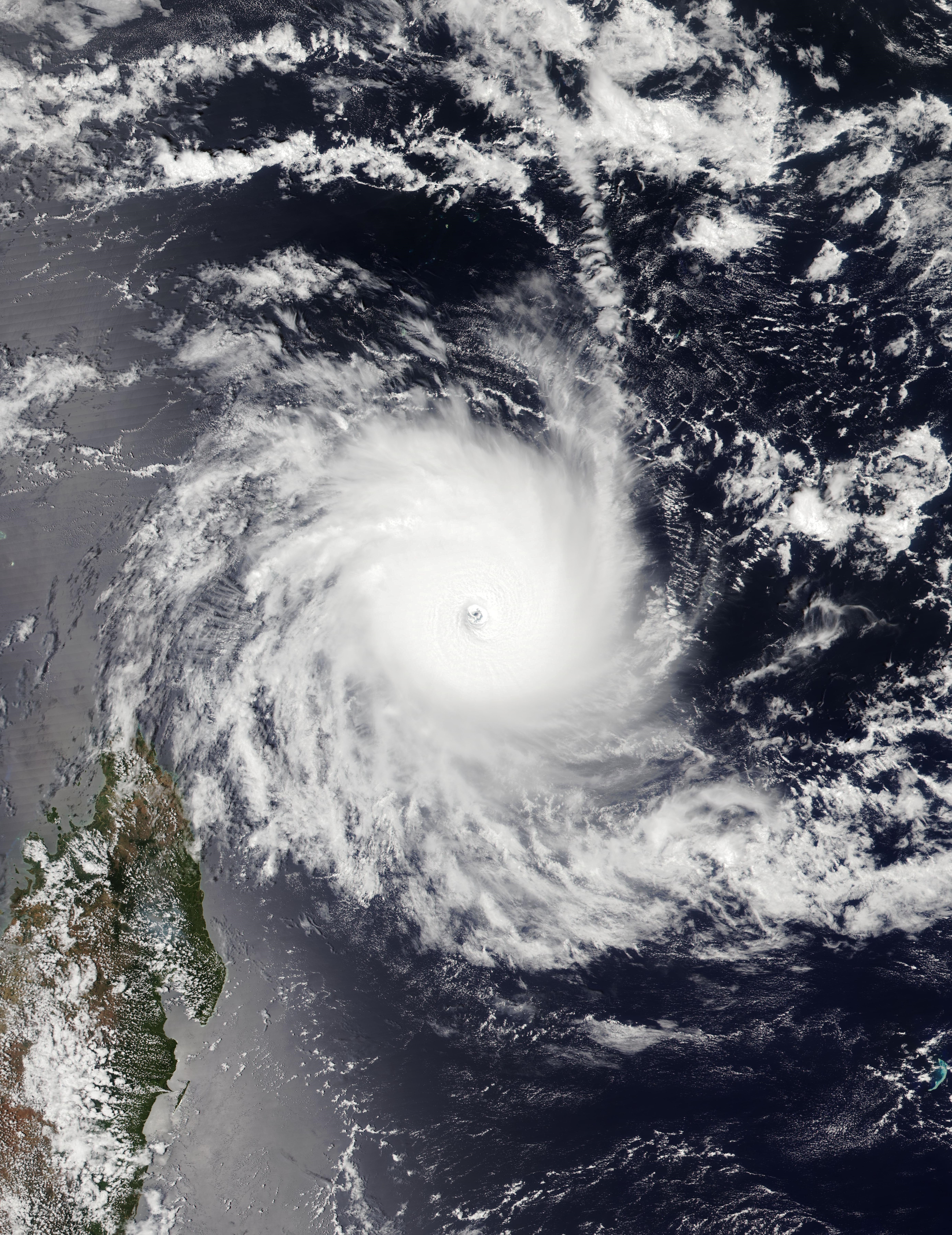
Cyclone Chido at peak intensity on 12 December 2024

Intense tropical cyclone is the second-highest classification used within the South-West Indian Ocean to classify tropical cyclones with and are amongst the strongest tropical cyclones that can form on Earth. A total of 101 tropical cyclones have peaked as an intense tropical cyclone while in the South-West Indian Ocean, which is denoted as the part of the Indian Ocean to the south of the equator and to the west of 90°E. The most recent intense tropical cyclone was Cyclone Chido of the 2024–25 season.

== Background ==
The South-West Indian Ocean tropical cyclone basin is located to the south of the Equator between Africa and 90°E. The basin is officially monitored by Météo-France's tropical cyclone centre on the island of Reunion (MFR, RSMC La Réunion). In addition, the Mauritius Meteorological Service and the Madagascan Direction Generale de la Meteorologie are classified as subregional tropical cyclone advisory centres and are responsible for monitoring and naming tropical cyclones in consultation with RSMC La Réunion. Other meteorological services such as the Australian Bureau of Meteorology, Mauritius Meteorological Service as well as the United States Joint Typhoon Warning Center also monitor the basin. Within the basin an intense tropical cyclone is a tropical cyclone that has 10-minute mean maximum sustained wind speeds between 90–115 knots (165–215 km/h; 105–130 mph).

== Systems ==
Name	Duration	Peak intensity		Areas affected	Damage (USD)	Deaths	Refs
Name	Duration	Wind speed	Pressure	Areas affected	Damage (USD)	Deaths	Refs
Deidre–Delinda	December 26, 1973 – January 4, 1974	205 km/h (125 mph)	965 hPa (28.50 inHg)	None	None	None	
Blandine	January 6 – 12, 1975	175 km/h (110 mph)	980 hPa (28.94 inHg)	None	None	None	
Robyn–Deborah	December 26, 1973 – January 4, 1974	205 km/h (125 mph)	965 hPa (28.50 inHg)	None	None	None	
Aurore	November 21, 1977	165 km/h (105 mph)	927 hPa (27.37 inHg)	No land areas	None	None	
Celine	February 9–10, 1979	165 km/h (105 mph)	927 hPa (27.37 inHg)	Mauritius, Reunion, Rodrigues	None	Unknown	
Idylle	April 7–13, 1979	175 km/h (110 mph)	927 hPa (27.37 inHg)	Western Australia	None	Minor	
Albine	November 30, 1979	175 km/h (110 mph)	960 hPa (28.35 inHg)	No land areas	None	None	
Viola–Claudette	December 15–19, 1979	205 km/h (125 mph)	930 hPa (27.46 inHg)	St. Brandon, Mauritius, Réunion	5	$175 million	
Chris–Damia	January 9–16, 1982	215 km/h (130 mph)	898 hPa (26.52 inHg)	Rodrigues, Mauritius	0	$650,000	
Karla	April 30 – May 2, 1982	165 km/h (105 mph)	927 hPa (27.37 inHg)	No land areas	None	None	
Andry	December 9–12, 1983	165 km/h (105 mph)	927 hPa (27.37 inHg)	Agaléga, Madagascar	1	Extensive	
Bakoly	December 23, 1983	165 km/h (105 mph)	927 hPa (27.37 inHg)	Mauritius, Réunion	None	$21 million	
Jaminy	February 16–17, 1984	165 km/h (105 mph)	927 hPa (27.37 inHg)	No land areas	None	None	
Kamisy	April 8, 1984	165 km/h (105 mph)	927 hPa (27.37 inHg)	Madagascar, Comoros, Mayotte, Seychelles	69	$250 million	
Erinesta	February 4–5, 1986	165 km/h (105 mph)	927 hPa (27.37 inHg)	Tromelin Island, Madagascar, Réunion	None	None	
Gasitao	March 20, 1988	165 km/h (105 mph)	927 hPa (27.37 inHg)	No land areas	None	None	
Walter–Gregoara	March 17–18, 1990	165 km/h (105 mph)	927 hPa (27.37 inHg)	No land areas	None	None	
Harriet–Heather	March 2–3, 1992	175 km/h (110 mph)	930 hPa (27.46 inHg)	No land areas	None	None	
Edwina	March 2–3, 1993	165 km/h (105 mph)	925 hPa (27.32 inHg)	Rodrigues, Mauritius, Réunion	None	None	
Jourdanne	April 6–7, 1993	175 km/h (110 mph)	930 hPa (27.46 inHg)	No land areas	None	None	
Geralda	January 30 – February 2, 1994	205 km/h (125 mph)	905 hPa (26.72 inHg)	Madagascar	231	10 million	
Litanne	March 11, 1994	195 km/h (120 mph)	910 hPa (26.87 inHg)	St. Brandon, Madagascar	0	None	
Nadia	March 22, 1994	165 km/h (105 mph)	925 hPa (27.32 inHg)	Madagascar, Comoros, Mayotte, Mozambique, Malawi	252	$20.2 million	
Odille	April 11–12, 1994	165 km/h (105 mph)	925 hPa (27.32 inHg)	St. Brandon, Rodrigues	None	Unknown	
Albertine	November 28–29, 1994	165 km/h (105 mph)	925 hPa (27.32 inHg)	Diego Garcia, Rodrigues	None	Unknown	
Dorina	January 21–22, 1995	165 km/h (105 mph)	925 hPa (27.32 inHg)	Rodrigues	0	None	
Marlene	April 3–4, 1995	185 km/h (115 mph)	920 hPa (27.17 inHg)	No land areas	None	None	
Daryl–Agnielle	November 20–21, 1995	165 km/h (105 mph)	925 hPa (27.32 inHg)	No land areas	None	None	
Bonita	January 8–9, 1996	185 km/h (115 mph)	920 hPa (27.17 inHg)	Madagascar, Mozambique; Zimbabwe, Zambia, Angola	42	Unknown	
Itelle	April 12–14, 1996	165 km/h (105 mph)	925 hPa (27.32 inHg)	No land areas	None	None	
Melanie–Bellamine	November 4–5, 1996	165 km/h (105 mph)	925 hPa (27.32 inHg)	No land areas	None	None	
Daniella	December 5–7, 1996	185 km/h (115 mph)	915 hPa (27.02 inHg)	Mauritius, Réunion	3	Unknown	
Davina	March 7–8, 1999	175 km/h (110 mph)	930 hPa (27.46 inHg)	Rodrigues, Mauritius, Réunion	2	Minor	
Frederic–Evrina	April 1, 1999	165 km/h (105 mph)	925 hPa (27.32 inHg)	No land areas	None	None	
Connie	January 27–29, 2000	185 km/h (115 mph)	930 hPa (27.46 inHg)	Mauritius, Réunion, Mozambique	3	None	
Leon–Eline	February 17 & 22, 2000	185 km/h (115 mph)	930 hPa (27.46 inHg)	Madagascar, Mozambique	114-722	$309 million	
Ando	January 5–7, 2001	195 km/h (120 mph)	925 hPa (27.32 inHg)	Seychelles, Mauritius, Réunion	2	None	
Charly	January 22–23, 2001	185 km/h (115 mph)	930 hPa (27.46 inHg)	Rodrigues, Mauritius, Réunion	0	None	
Dina	January 19–23, 2002	215 km/h (130 mph)	910 hPa (26.87 inHg)	Mauritius, Réunion	15	$287 million	
Francesca	February 4–5, 2002	195 km/h (120 mph)	925 hPa (27.32 inHg)	No land areas	None	None	
Guillaume	February 18–21, 2002	205 km/h (125 mph)	920 hPa (27.17 inHg)	Madagascar, Comoros; Mauritius, Réunion	0	Unknown	
Ikala	March 27, 2002	175 km/h (110 mph)	945 hPa (27.91 inHg)	No land areas	None	None	
Gerry	February 13, 2003	175 km/h (110 mph)	940 hPa (27.76 inHg)	Mauritius, Réunion	1	Unknown	
Japhet	March 1, 2003	165 km/h (105 mph)	935 hPa (27.61 inHg)	Mozambique, Zambia, Zimbabwe	25	Unknown	
Kalunde	March 7–11, 2003	215 km/h (135 mph)	910 hPa (26.87 inHg)	Rodrigues	None	$3.15 million	
Beni	November 13, 2003	165 km/h (105 mph)	935 hPa (27.61 inHg)	Mascarene Islands	0	None	
Frank	January 30–31, 2004	185 km/h (115 mph)	930 hPa (27.46 inHg)	No land areas	None	None	
Bento	November 23–25, 2004	215 km/h (130 mph)	915 hPa (27.02 inHg)	No land areas	None	None	
Ernest	January 22, 2005	175 km/h (110 mph)	950 hPa (28.05 inHg)	Mayotte, Madagascar	78	Unknown	
Bertie–Alvin	November 24, 2005	165 km/h (105 mph)	930 hPa (27.46 inHg)	No land areas	None	None	
Carina	February 27 – March 1, 2006	205 km/h (125 mph)	915 hPa (27.02 inHg)	No land areas	None	None	
Bondo	December 19–21, 2006	205 km/h (125 mph)	930 hPa (27.46 inHg)	Madagascar, Mozambique	11	None	
Dora	February 2–4, 2007	195 km/h (120 mph)	925 hPa (27.32 inHg)	Rodrigues	0	None	
Favio	February 20–22, 2007	195 km/h (120 mph)	925 hPa (27.32 inHg)	Mozambique, Madagascar	10	$71 million	
Gamede	February 25–26, 2007	175 km/h (110 mph)	935 hPa (27.61 inHg)	Mascarene Islands	4		
Indlala	March 14–15, 2007	165 km/h (105 mph)	935 hPa (27.61 inHg)	Madagascar	150	$240 million	
Jaya	March 31 – April 2, 2007	185 km/h (115 mph)	935 hPa (27.61 inHg)	Madagascar	1	None	
Hondo	February 6–10, 2008	215 km/h (130 mph)	915 hPa (27.02 inHg)	Mauritius, Réunion	0	Minimal	
Ivan	February 16–17, 2008	185 km/h (115 mph)	930 hPa (27.46 inHg)	Madagascar	93	$300 million	
Jokwe	March 7–8, 2008	195 km/h (120 mph)	940 hPa (27.76 inHg)	Madagascar, Mozambique	16	$80 million	
Kamba	March 10, 2008	185 km/h (115 mph)	930 hPa (27.46 inHg)	No land areas	None	None	
Fanele	January 20–21, 2009	185 km/h (115 mph)	930 hPa (27.46 inHg)	Madagascar	2	None	
Gael	February 6–8, 2009	185 km/h (115 mph)	930 hPa (27.46 inHg)	Madagascar	2	None	
Anja	November 15–16, 2009	175 km/h (110 mph)	950 hPa (28.05 inHg)	No land areas	None	None	
Cleo	December 8, 2009	195 km/h (120 mph)	930 hPa (27.46 inHg)	No land areas	None	None	
Gelane	February 19–20, 2010	205 km/h (125 mph)	930 hPa (27.46 inHg)	Réunion, Mauritius, Rodrigues, Madagascar	None	None	
Funso	January 23–25, 2012	205 km/h (125 mph)	925 hPa (27.32 inHg)	Mozambique, Malawi	40	Unknown	
Giovanna	February 10–11, 2012	195 km/h (120 mph)	935 hPa (27.61 inHg)	Mauritius, Réunion, Madagascar	35	Unknown	
Anais	October 14–15, 2012	185 km/h (115 mph)	945 hPa (27.91 inHg)	Madagascar	None	None	
Claudia	December 6–10, 2012	165 km/h (105 mph)	940 hPa (27.76 inHg)	No land areas	None	None	
Felleng	January 30, 2013	175 km/h (110 mph)	935 hPa (27.61 inHg)	Seychelles, Madagascar, Mauritius, Réunion	9	Unknown	
Amara	December 19–21, 2013	205 km/h (125 mph)	935 hPa (27.61 inHg)	Rodrigues	None	None	
Bejisa	December 30–31, 2013	165 km/h (105 mph)	950 hPa (28.05 inHg)	Seychelles, Réunion, Mauritius	1	$89.2 million	
Colin	January 11–12, 2014	205 km/h (125 mph)	915 hPa (27.02 inHg)	No land areas	None	None	
Kate	December 30, 2014	175 km/h (110 mph)	950 hPa (28.05 inHg)	No land areas	None	None	
Uriah	February 17–18, 2016	205 km/h (125 mph)	925 hPa (27.32 inHg)	No land areas	None	None	
Emeraude	March 17, 2016	205 km/h (125 mph)	940 hPa (27.76 inHg)	No land areas	None	None	
Enawo	March 6–7, 2017	205 km/h (125 mph)	932 hPa (27.52 inHg)	Madagascar, Réunion	96	$50 million	
Berguitta	January 15, 2018	175 km/h (110 mph)	940 hPa (27.76 inHg)	Mauritius, Réunion	1	$26.5 million	
Cebile	January 29 – February 2, 2018	185 km/h (115 mph)	944 hPa (27.88 inHg)	No land areas	None	None	
Dumazile	March 5, 2018	175 km/h (110 mph)	945 hPa (27.91 inHg)	Madagascar, Réunion	0	Unknown	
Alcide	November 8, 2018	175 km/h (110 mph)	965 hPa (28.50 inHg)	Madagascar	0	None	
Kenanga	December 19, 2018	185 km/h (115 mph)	942 hPa (27.82 inHg)	No land areas	None	None	
Cilida	December 20–22, 2018	215 km/h (130 mph)	940 hPa (27.76 inHg)	Mauritius	0	Minimal	
Funani	February 7–8, 2019	195 km/h (120 mph)	940 hPa (27.76 inHg)	Rodrigues	0	Minimal	
Gelena	February 9–10, 2019	205 km/h (125 mph)	942 hPa (27.82 inHg)	Madagascar, Mauritius, Rodrigues	0	$1 million	
Haleh	March 4–5, 2019	165 km/h (105 mph)	945 hPa (27.91 inHg)	No land areas	None	None	
Idai	March 11, 2019	195 km/h (120 mph)	940 hPa (27.76 inHg)	Mozambique, Malawi; Madagascar, Zimbabwe	1303	$2.2 billion	
Joaninha	March 25–28, 2019	185 km/h (115 mph)	939 hPa (27.73 inHg)	Rodrigues	0	$10.5 million	
Kenneth	April 25, 2019	215 km/h (130 mph)	934 hPa (27.58 inHg)	Seychelles, Madagascar, Comoros, Mozambique, Tanzania, Malawi	52	$100 million	
Herold	March 17, 2020	165 km/h (105 mph)	957 hPa (28.26 inHg)	Madagascar, Mascarene Islands	5	Unknown	
Irondro	April 4, 2020	175 km/h (110 mph)	945 hPa (27.91 inHg)	No land areas	None	None	
Batsirai	January 27 – February 5, 2022	205 km/h (125 mph)	923 hPa (27.26 inHg)	Mauritius, Réunion, Madagascar	123	190 million	
Emnati	January 20 – 22, 2022	195 km/h (120 mph)	940 hPa (27.76 inHg)	Mauritius, Réunion, Madagascar	15	1 million	
Vernon	22 February – 3 March 2022	195 km/h (120 mph)	950 hPa (28.05 inHg)	None	None	None	
Halima	March 25 – 26, 2022	195 km/h (120 mph)	939 hPa (27.73 inHg)	None	None	None	
Fabien	May 16 – 17, 2023	175 km/h (110 mph)	958 hPa (28.29 inHg)	Diego Garcia	16	None	
Anggrek	January 26 – 30, 2024	185 km/h (115 mph)	950 hPa (28.05 inHg)	None	None	None	
Djoungou	February 18 – 19, 2024	215 km/h (130 mph)	922 hPa (27.23 inHg)	None	None	None	
Bheki	November 16 –18, 2024	195 km/h (120 mph)	943 hPa (27.85 inHg)	None	None	None	
Chido	December 7 –15, 2024	215 km/h (130 mph)	935 hPa (27.61 inHg)	Mauritius, Seychelles, Madagascar, Mayotte, Comoros, Mozambique	$3.9 billion	172	
Dikeledi	January 16, 2025	175 km/h (110 mph)	945 hPa (27.91 inHg)	Madagascar, Mayotte, Comoros, Mozambique	Unknown	9	
Grant	December 29, 2025	205 km/h (125 mph)	944 hPa (27.88 inHg)	St. Brandon, Tromelin Island, Madagascar	None	None	
Dudzai	January 12-13, 2026 & January 16, 2026	205 km/h (125 mph)	937 hPa (27.67 inHg)	Rodrigues, Mauritius, Réunion	None	None	

== Other systems ==
In addition to the systems listed above the Mauritius Meteorological Service classifies tropical cyclones in March 1931, January 1945, February 1945, January and February 1946, April 1958 as intense tropical cyclones. It also classifies Alix of 1960, Carol of 1960, Beryl of 1961, Jenny of 1962, Danielle of 1964, Louise of 1970, Gervaise of 1975, Fleur of 1978, Hyacinthe of 1980, Jacinthe of 1980, Laure of 1980, Florine of 1981, and Hollanda of 1994 as intense tropical cyclones.

=== Systems classified as an ITC per the BOM ===
- Cyclone Kirsty 1985 - 110 kts.
- Cyclone Jane–Irna 1992 - 110 kts.

Savannah 2019 weakened into a tropical cyclone as it moved into the basin from the Australian region.

== Climatology ==
Intense tropical cyclones by month
Month	Number of storms
January	17
February	19
March	21
April	10
May	1
June	0
July	0
August	0
September	0
October	1
November	9
December	10

Intense tropical cyclones by decade
Decade	Number of storms
1970s	5
1980s	8
1990s	18
2000s	31
2010s	25
2020s	8

== See also ==
- South-West Indian Ocean tropical cyclone
