= List of South-West Indian Ocean tropical cyclones =

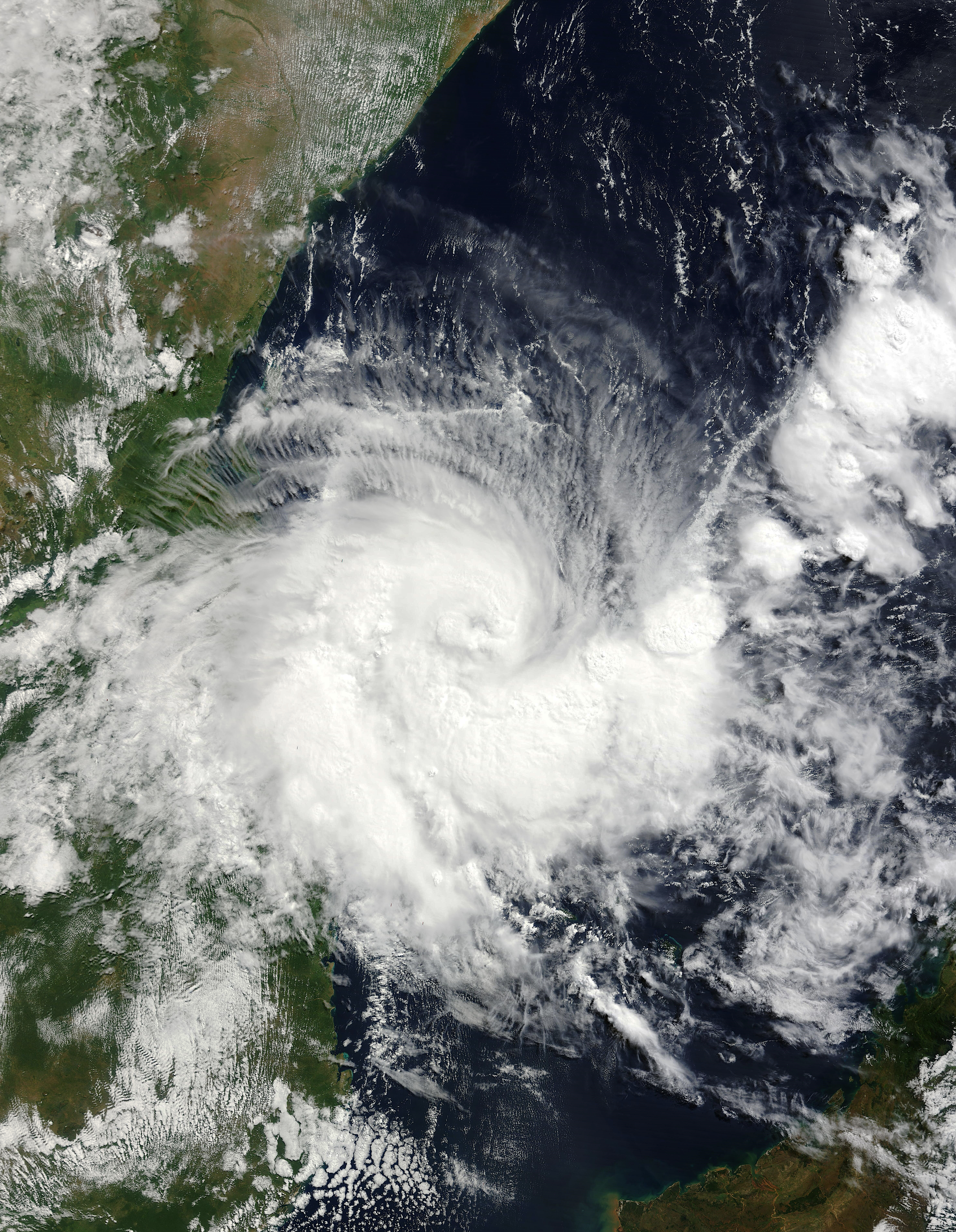
Satellite image of Cyclone Hidaya

Within the South-West Indian Ocean, the term tropical cyclone is reserved for those systems, that have winds of at least 65 knots (120 km/h; 75 mph). It is the third-highest classification used within the South-West Indian Ocean to classify tropical cyclones with.

== Background ==
The South-West Indian Ocean tropical cyclone basin is located to the south of the Equator between Africa and 90°E. The basin is officially monitored by Météo-France who run the Regional Specialised Meteorological Centre in La Réunion, while other meteorological services such as the Australian Bureau of Meteorology, Mauritius Meteorological Service as well as the United States Joint Typhoon Warning Center also monitor the basin. Within the basin a tropical cyclone is a tropical system that has 10-minute maximum sustained wind speeds between 65–89 knots (120–165 km/h; 75–100 mph).

== Systems ==
Name	Duration	Peak intensity		Areas affected	Damage (USD)	Deaths	Refs
Name	Duration	Wind speed	Pressure	Areas affected	Damage (USD)	Deaths	Refs
Marcelle	29 April – 9 May, 1973	130 km/h (80 mph)	973 hPa (28.73 inHg)	South-Western Australia	Unknown	None	
Bernadette	October 16 – 28, 1973	150 km/h (90 mph)	985 hPa (29.09 inHg)	None	None	None	
Robyn-Deborah	February 14 – 29, 1975	150 km/h (90 mph)	964 hPa (28.47 inHg)	Madagascar			
Barbara	December 3 – 19, 1975	175 km/h (110 mph)	980 hPa (28.94 inHg)	None	None	None	
Naomi	April 21 – May 2, 1983	150 km/h (90 mph)	960 hPa (28.35 inHg)	None	None	None	(Note: The windspeeds and minimum pressure estimates for these systems, are taken from the archives of the Australian Bureau of Meteorology and compared to the intensity scale for the South-West Indian Ocean.)
Oscar	October 22 – November 1, 1983	140 km/h (85 mph)	965 hPa (28.50 inHg)	None	None	None	
Konita	May 2 – 5, 1993	130 km/h (80 mph)	955 hPa (28.20 inHg)	None	None	None	
Kesiny	May 2 — 5, 2002	130 km/h (80 mph)	965 hPa (28.50 inHg)	Madagascar	Unknown	33	
Manou	May 1–13, 2003	155 km/h (100 mph)	950 hPa (28.05 inHg)	Madagascar	Unknown	89	
Joalane	April 2–11	140 km/h (85 mph)	962 hPa (28.41 inHg)	No land areas	None	None	
Carlos	February 2 – 10, 2017	130 km/h (80 mph)	965 hPa (28.50 inHg)	Réunion, Mauritius	None	None	
Dineo	February 13–17	140 km/h (85 mph)	955 hPa (28.20 inHg)	Mozambique, South Africa, Zimbabwe, Botswana, Malawi	$217 million	280	
Ava	December 27 – January 9	155 km/h (100 mph)	965 hPa (28.50 inHg)	Madagascar	$4.62 million	73	
Irving	January 6–9, 2018	150 km/h (90 mph)	964 hPa (28.47 inHg)	No land areas	None	None	
Fakir	April 20–24, 2018	130 km/h (80 mph)	975 hPa (28.79 inHg)	Madagascar, Réunion, Mauritius	$24.5 million	2	
Savannah	March 18, 2019	165 km/h (105 mph)	966 hPa (28.53 inHg)	No land areas	None	None	
Lorna	April 28–29, 2019	150 km/h (90 mph)	964 hPa (28.47 inHg)	No land areas	None	None	
Belna	December 7–9, 2019	155 km/h (100 mph)	955 hPa (28.20 inHg)	Seychelles, Mayotte, Comoros, Madagascar	$25 million	9	
Calvinia	December 31, 2019 – January 1, 2020	120 km/h (75 mph)	972 hPa (28.70 inHg)	Mauritius, Rodrigues	Unknown	None	
Gabekile	February 16, 2020	130 km/h (80 mph)	980 hPa (28.94 inHg)	No land areas	None	None	
Alicia	November 12, 2020	130 km/h (80 mph)	975 hPa (28.79 inHg)	No land areas	None	None	
Eloise	January 22–23, 2021	150 km/h (90 mph)	967 hPa (28.56 inHg)	Madagascar, Mozambique, Malawi, Zimbabwe, South Africa, Eswatini	$10 million	27	
Guambe	February 19–20, 2021	165 km/h (105 mph)	953 hPa (28.14 inHg)	Madagascar, Mozambique, South Africa, Eswatini	$1 million	None	
Marian	March 1–2, 2021	165 km/h (105 mph)	955 hPa (28.20 inHg)	None	None	None	
Jobo	April 21, 2021	120 km/h (75 mph)	985 hPa (29.09 inHg)	Seychelles, Madagascar, Tanzania	Unknown	22	
Gombe	March 11, 2022	155 km/h (100 mph)	955 hPa (28.20 inHg)	Madagascar, Mozambique, Malawi	$95 million	72	
Cheneso	January 25–27, 2023	130 km/h (80 mph)	959 hPa (28.32 inHg)	Madagascar	Unknown	33	
Dingani	February 12–14, 2023	140 km/h (85 mph)	971 hPa (28.67 inHg)	None	None	None	
Enala	February 23, 2023	120 km/h (75 mph)	980 hPa (28.94 inHg)	None	None	None	
Alvaro	December 30, 2023 — January 3, 2024	120 km/h (75 mph)	982 hPa (29.00 inHg)	Mozambique, Madagascar	Unknown	19	
Belal	January 14–17, 2024	140 km/h (85 mph)	969 hPa (28.61 inHg)	Mauritius, Réunion	Unknown	5	
Gamane	March 25–28, 2024	150 km/h (90 mph)	970 hPa (28.64 inHg)	Madagascar	Unknown	19	
Hidaya	April 30–May 4, 2024	130 km/h (80 mph)	976 hPa (28.82 inHg)	Seychelles, Comoro Islands, Tanzania, Kenya	Unknown	1	
Ialy	May 21, 2024	120 km/h (75 mph)	983 hPa (29.03 inHg)	Seychelles, Madagascar, Tanzania, Kenya, Somalia	None	None	
Taliah	February 12 –present	120 km/h (75 mph)	970 hPa (28.64 inHg)	None	None	None	

== Climatology ==
Intense tropical cyclones by month
Month	Number of storms
January	4
February	7
March	4
April	7
May	3
June	0
July	0
August	0
September	0
October	2
November	0
December	2

Intense tropical cyclones by decade
Decade	Number of storms
1970s	0
1980s	0
1990s	0
2000s	0
2010s	2
2020s	1

== See also ==
- South-West Indian Ocean tropical cyclone
