= List of South-West Indian Ocean moderate tropical storms =

Within the South-West Indian Ocean, the term moderate tropical storms is reserved for those systems, that have winds of at least 35 knots (65 km/h; 40 mph). It is the second-highest classification used within the South-West Indian Ocean to classify tropical cyclones with.

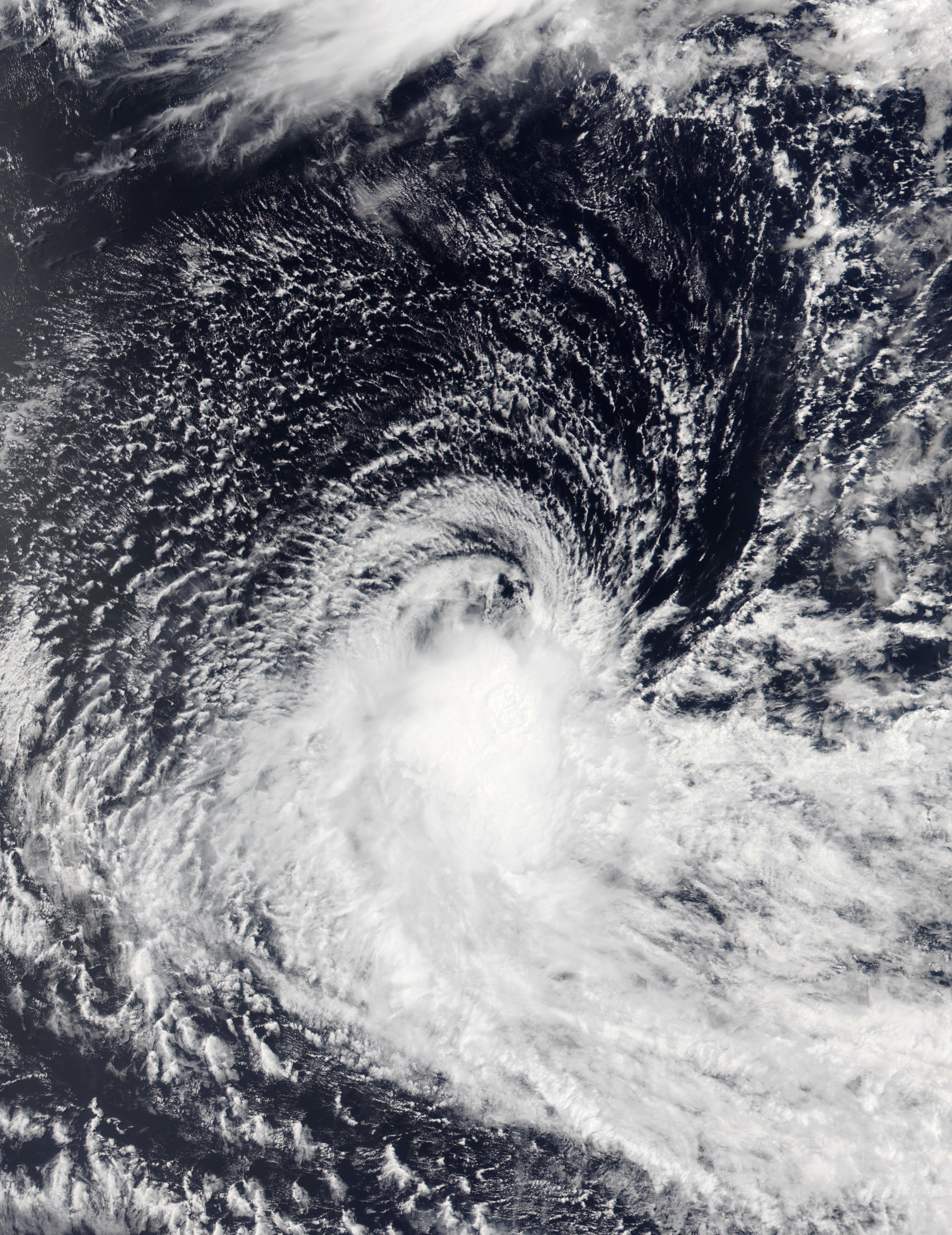
Satellite image of Tropical Storm Ashley

== Background ==
The South-West Indian Ocean tropical cyclone basin is located to the south of the Equator between Africa and 90°E. The basin is officially monitored by Météo-France who run the Regional Specialised Meteorological Centre in La Réunion, while other meteorological services such as the Australian Bureau of Meteorology, Mauritius Meteorological Service as well as the United States Joint Typhoon Warning Center also monitor the basin. Within the basin a moderate tropical storm is a tropical storm that has 10-minute maximum sustained wind speeds between 34–47 kn (63–87 km/h; 39–54 mph).

== Systems ==
Name	Duration	Peak intensity		Areas affected	Damage (USD)	Deaths	Refs
Name	Duration	Wind speed	Pressure	Areas affected	Damage (USD)	Deaths	Refs
Alice	September 14 — 24, 1973	75 km/h (45 mph)	1000 hPa (29.53 inHg)	Madagascar	None	None	
Christiane	December 13 — 21, 1973	75 km/h (45 mph)	995 hPa (29.38 inHg)	None	None	None	
Esmeralda	December 30, 1973 — January 5, 1974	85 km/h (50 mph)	995 hPa (29.38 inHg)	None	None	None	
Audrey	November 17 — 29, 1975	85 km/h (50 mph)	995 hPa (29.38 inHg)	None	None	None	
Elsa	March 9 - 12, 1976	85 km/h (50 mph)	995 hPa (29.38 inHg)	None	None	None	
Frederique	March 25 — 26, 1976	75 km/h (45 mph)	1005 hPa (29.68 inHg)	None	None	None	
Gladys	March 27 — April 10, 1976	85 km/h (50 mph)	998 hPa (29.47 inHg)	None	None	None	
Bert–Heliotrope	April 3 — 12, 1976	85 km/h (50 mph)	1000 hPa (29.53 inHg)	None	None	None	
Carol	May 3 — 9, 1976	85 km/h (50 mph)	992 hPa (29.29 inHg)	None	None	None	
Agathe	October 2 — 15, 1976	75 km/h (45 mph)	995 hPa (29.38 inHg)				
Arilisy	October 27 — 31, 1982	65 km/h (40 mph)	1000 hPa (29.53 inHg)	Agalega, Madagascar	None	None	
Iarisena	May 6 — 14, 1988	65 km/h (40 mph)	991 hPa (29.26 inHg)	None	None	None	
Adelinina	October 30 — November 8, 1988	80 km/h (50 mph)	984 hPa (29.06 inHg)	None	None	None	
Gritelle	June 8 — 12, 1991	80 km/h (50 mph)	984 hPa (29.06 inHg)	None	None	None	
Avoina	September 29 — October 4, 1992	75 km/h (45 mph)	988 hPa (29.18 inHg)	None	None	None	
Babie	October 18 — 21, 1992	70 km/h (45 mph)	991 hPa (29.26 inHg)	None	None	None	
Jenna	May 4 — 5, 1996	85 km/h (50 mph)	984 hPa (29.06 inHg)	None	None	None	
One	September 5 — 8, 2002	65 km/h (40 mph)	1003 hPa (29.62 inHg)	Seychelles	$50,000	None	
Abaimba	September 28 — October 6, 2003	80 km/h (50 mph)	995 hPa (29.38 inHg)	None	None	None	
Phoebe	August 30 — September 1, 2004	65 km/h (40 mph)	1000 hPa (29.53 inHg)	None	None	None	(Note: The windspeeds and minimum pressure estimates are taken from the Australian Bureau of Meteorology archives and compared to the intensity scale for the South-West Indian Ocean)
01U/01S	July 26 — August 1, 2007	75 km/h (45 mph)	992 hPa (29.29 inHg)	None	None	None	
Asma	October 16 — 24, 2008	85 km/h (50 mph)	985 hPa (29.09 inHg)	Madagascar	Unknown	None	

== 2010's ==
Name	Duration	Peak intensity		Areas affected	Damage (USD)	Deaths	Refs
Name	Duration	Wind speed	Pressure	Areas affected	Damage (USD)	Deaths	Refs
Bongani	November 22 – 25, 2009	75 km/h (45 mph)	997 hPa (29.44 inHg)	Madagascar	Unknown	Unknown	
David	December 12 – 25, 2009	85 km/h (50 mph)	987 hPa (29.15 inHg)	Reunion, Mauritius, Madagascar	Unknown	Unknown	
Fami	February 1 – 3, 2010	85 km/h (50 mph)	990 hPa (29.23 inHg)	Madagascar	Unknown	Unknown	
Cherono	March 13 – 23, 2011	75 km/h (45 mph)	993 hPa (29.32 inHg)	Rodrigues Island	Unknown	Unknown	
Alenga	December 4 – 7, 2011	85 km/h (50 mph)	994 hPa (29.35 inHg)	None	None	None	
Chanda	January 5 – 10, 2012	75 km/h (45 mph)	992 hPa (29.29 inHg)	Madagascar	Unknown	1	
Hilwa	February 14 – 22, 2012	75 km/h (45 mph)	993 hPa (29.32 inHg)	Rodrigues	Unknown	Unknown	
Kuena	June 3 – 8, 2012	85 km/h (50 mph)	994 hPa (29.35 inHg)	None	None	None	
Emang	January 12 - 17, 2013	65 km/h (40 mph)	994 hPa (29.35 inHg)	None	None	None	
Jamala	May 7 – 16, 2013	75 km/h (45 mph)	992 hPa (29.29 inHg)	None	None	None	
One/01S	October 23 – 27, 2013	65 km/h (40 mph)	997 hPa (29.44 inHg)	Chagos Archipelago	Unknown	Unknown	
Deliwe	January 14 – 22, 2014	85 km/h (50 mph)	990 hPa (29.23 inHg)	Madagascar, Mozambique	Unknown	2	
Ivanoe	April 3 – 6, 2014	85 km/h (50 mph)	987 hPa (29.15 inHg)	None	None	None	
Diamondra	January 26 – 30, 2015	85 km/h (50 mph)	987 hPa (29.15 inHg)	None	None	None	
Haliba	March 4 – 11, 2015	85 km/h (50 mph)	993 hPa (29.32 inHg)	Madagascar, Réunion, Mauritius	$6.4 million	26	
Bohale	December 7 – 12, 2015	65 km/h (40 mph)	995 hPa (29.38 inHg)	None	None	None	
Daya	February 7 – 12, 2016	65 km/h (40 mph)	990 hPa (29.23 inHg)	Madagascar, Réunion, Mauritius	Unknown	Unknown	
Seven/15S	March 28 – 30, 2016	85 km/h (50 mph)	993 hPa (29.32 inHg)	None	None	None	
Fernando	March 6 – 14, 2017	65 km/h (40 mph)	997 hPa (29.44 inHg)	Rodrigues	Unknown	Unknown	
One	September 13 – 17, 2018	75 km/h (45 mph)	1004 hPa (29.65 inHg)	None	None	None	
Desmond	January 17 – 22, 2019	65 km/h (40 mph)	995 hPa (29.38 inHg)	Mozambique, Madagascar	Unknown	Unknown	
Eketsang	January 22 – 24, 2019	75 km/h (45 mph)	993 hPa (29.32 inHg)	Madagascar	Unknown	27	
Esami	January 23 – 26, 2020	85 km/h (50 mph)	990 hPa (29.23 inHg)	Rodrigues	Unknown	Unknown	
Francisco	February 3 – 15, 2020	85 km/h (50 mph)	994 hPa (29.35 inHg)	Madagascar	Unknown	1	
Jeruto	April 13 – 16, 2020	75 km/h (45 mph)	999 hPa (29.50 inHg)	None	None	None	
Joshua	January 17 – 19, 2021	85 km/h (50 mph)	991 hPa (29.26 inHg)	None	None	None	
Iman	March 2 – 8, 2021	85 km/h (50 mph)	992 hPa (29.29 inHg)	Mozambique, Madagascar, Réunion, Mauritius	Unknown	Unknown	
Ana	January 20 – 25, 2022	85 km/h (50 mph)	990 hPa (29.23 inHg)	Mascarene Islands, Madagascar, Southern Africa	$25 million	142	
Cliff	February 3 – 5, 2022	75 km/h (45 mph)	994 hPa (29.35 inHg)	None	None	None	
Dumako	February 10 – 18, 2022	85 km/h (50 mph)	993 hPa (29.32 inHg)	Madagascar, Mozambique	$1 million	14	
Fezile	February 16 – 18, 2022	75 km/h (45 mph)	980 hPa (28.94 inHg)	None	None	None	
Karim	May 5 – 7, 2022	75 km/h (45 mph)	994 hPa (29.35 inHg)	None	None	None	
Ashley	September 23 – 28, 2022	75 km/h (45 mph)	1,000 hPa (29.53 inHg)	None	None	None	
Balita	October 3 – 9, 2022	65 km/h (40 mph)	996 hPa (29.41 inHg)	None	None	None	
Ancha	September 30 – October 4, 2024	85 km/h (50 mph)	992 hPa (29.29 inHg)	None	None	None	
Elvis	January 24 – 31, 2025	85 km/h (50 mph)	990 hPa (29.23 inHg)	Madagascar	None	None	
Faida	January 28 – February 4, 2025	65 km/h (40 mph)	996 hPa (29.41 inHg)	Mascarene Islands, Madagascar	None	None	

== See also ==
- South-West Indian Ocean tropical cyclone
