= List of South-West Indian Ocean severe tropical storms =

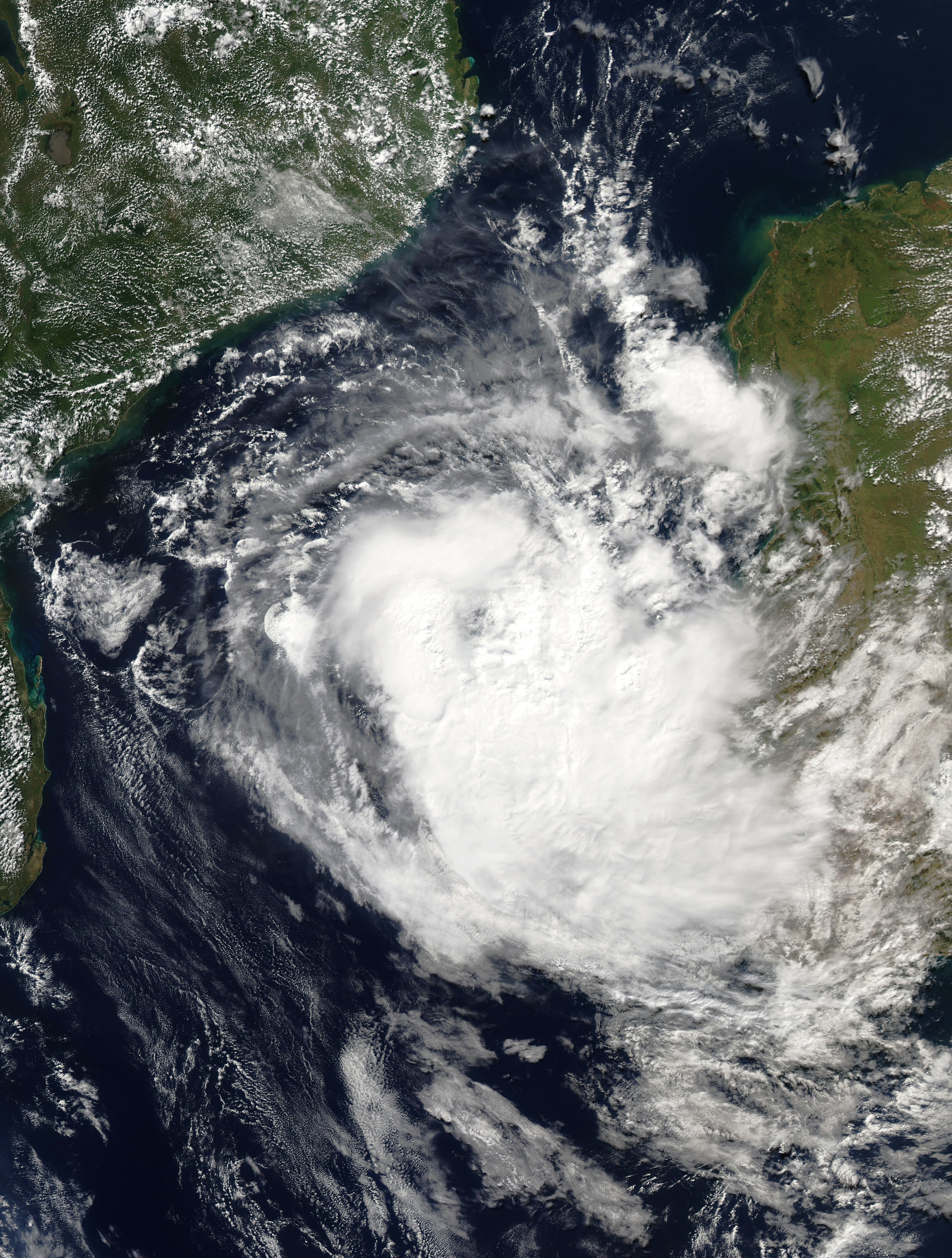
Satellite image of Tropical Storm Jasmine

Within the South-West Indian Ocean, the term severe tropical storms is reserved for those systems, that have winds of at least 50 knots (95 km/h; 60 mph). It is the third-highest classification used within the South-West Indian Ocean to classify tropical cyclones with.

== Background ==
The South-West Indian Ocean tropical cyclone basin is located to the south of the Equator between Africa and 90°E. The basin is officially monitored by Météo-France who run the Regional Specialised Meteorological Centre in La Réunion, while other meteorological services such as the Australian Bureau of Meteorology, Mauritius Meteorological Service as well as the United States Joint Typhoon Warning Center also monitor the basin. Within the basin a severe tropical storm is a tropical storm that has 10-minute maximum sustained wind speeds between 48–63 kn (89–117 km/h; 55–72 mph).

== Systems ==
Name	Duration	Peak intensity		Areas affected	Damage (USD)	Deaths	Refs
Name	Duration	Wind speed	Pressure	Areas affected	Damage (USD)	Deaths	Refs
Roma	18 February 23, 1973	100 km/h (65 mph)	982 hPa (29.00 inHg)	None	None	None	
Honorine	April 12 – 23, 1974	95 km/h (60 mph)	998 hPa (29.47 inHg)	None	None	None	
Norah	November 1 – 4, 1974	95 km/h (60 mph)	988 hPa (29.18 inHg)	Christmas Island, Cocos Island	None	None	
Ines	March 9 – 19, 1975	110 km/h (70 mph)	985 hPa (29.09 inHg)	None	None	None	
Junon	April 18 – 22, 1975	95 km/h (60 mph)	1005 hPa (29.68 inHg)	None	None	None	
Kevin	May 5 – 12, 1979	95 km/h (60 mph)	986 hPa (29.12 inHg)	None	None	None	
Tony	August 26 – 31, 1979	95 km/h (60 mph)	990 hPa (29.23 inHg)	None	None	None	
Ikonjo	May 11 – 20, 1990	95 km/h (60 mph)	976 hPa (28.82 inHg)	Seychelles	Minimal	None	
Antoinette	October 15 – 21, 1996	115 km/h (70 mph)	965 hPa (28.50 inHg)	None	None	None	
Alex-Andree	October 28 — 30, 2001	95 km/h (60 mph)	985 hPa (29.09 inHg)	None	None	None	
Juba	May 5 — 15, 2004	100 km/h (65 mph)	975 hPa (28.79 inHg)	None	None	None	

== 2010's ==
Name	Duration	Peak intensity		Areas affected	Damage (USD)	Deaths	Refs
Name	Duration	Wind speed	Pressure	Areas affected	Damage (USD)	Deaths	Refs
Adjali	November 15 – 21, 2014	100 km/h (65 mph)	987 hPa (29.15 inHg)	None	None	None	
Chedza	January 14 – 19, 2015	_{105 km/h (65 mph)}	975 hPa (28.79 inHg)	Southern Africa, Madagascar, Réunion	$40 million	80	
Fundi	February 5 – 8, 2015	100 km/h (65 mph)	978 hPa (28.88 inHg)	Madagascar	Unknown	5	
Glenda	February 22 – 28, 2015	95 km/h (60 mph)	970 hPa (28.64 inHg)	None	None	None	
Ikola	April 5 – 6, 2017	105 km/h (65 mph)	982 hPa (29.00 inHg)	None	None	None	
Abela	July 12 – 20, 2016	95 km/h (60 mph)	987 hPa (29.15 inHg)	Madagascar	Unknown	None	
Flamboyan	April 28 – May 1, 2018	110 km/h (70 mph)	978 hPa (28.88 inHg)	None	None	None	
Bongoyo	December 4 — 10, 2020	100 km/h (65 mph)	988 hPa (29.18 inHg)	Cocos Islands	None	None	
Chalane	December 19 – 30, 2020	110 km/h (70 mph)	983 hPa (29.03 inHg)	Madagascar, Mozambique, Zimbabwe, Botswana, Namibia	Minimal	7	
Danilo	December 28, 2020 — January 12, 2021	100 km/h (65 mph)	981 hPa (28.97 inHg)	Chagos Archipelago	None	None	
Ana	January 20 — 20, 2022	95 km/h (60 mph)	987 hPa (29.15 inHg)	Mascarene Islands, Madagascar, Southern Africa	25 million	142	
Fezile	February 16 — 18, 2022	95 km/h (60 mph)	978 hPa (28.88 inHg)	None	None	None	
Jasmine	April 21 — 27, 2022	110 km/h (70 mph)	982 hPa (29.00 inHg)	Comoros, Mozambique, Madagascar	Unknown	10	
Candice	January 26, 2024	95 km/h (60 mph)	985 hPa (29.09 inHg)	Mauritius	Unknown	None	
Eleanor	February 21–23, 2024	100 km/h (65 mph)	984 hPa (29.06 inHg)	Mauritius, Reunion	Unknown	None	

== Climatology ==
Intense tropical cyclones by month
Month	Number of storms
January	0
February	0
March	0
April	0
May	0
June	0
July	0
August	0
September	0
October	0
November	0
December	3

Severe tropical storms by decade
Decade	Number of storms
1970s	0
1980s	0
1990s	0
2000s	0
2010s	0
2020s	4

== See also ==
- South-West Indian Ocean tropical cyclone
