= 1992–93 South-West Indian Ocean cyclone season =

Cyclone season in the Southwest Indian Ocean

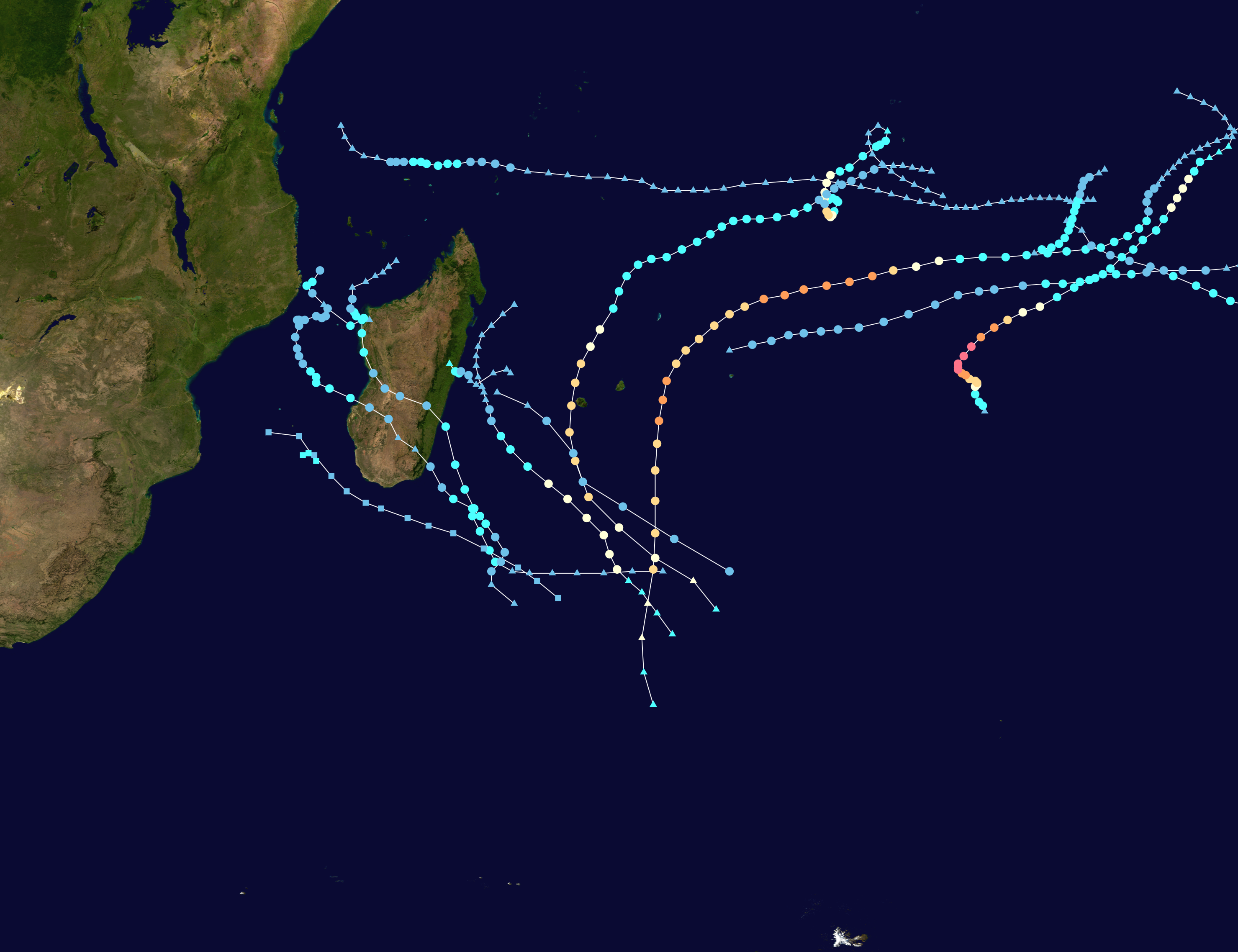
- Season summary map

Seasonal boundaries
- First system formed: September 27, 1992
- Last system dissipated: May 7, 1993

Strongest storm
- Name: Edwina
  - Maximum winds: 175 km/h (110 mph) (10-minute sustained)
  - Lowest pressure: 925 hPa (mbar)

Seasonal statistics
- Total depressions: 18
- Total storms: 10
- Tropical cyclones: 4
- Intense tropical cyclones: 2
- Total fatalities: 20 total, 12 missing
- Total damage: Unknown

Related articles
- 1992–93 Australian region cyclone season; 1992–93 South Pacific cyclone season

The 1992–93 South-West Indian Ocean cyclone season lasted longer than normal, with the first storm Aviona forming on September 27 and the final storm Konita not dissipating until May 7. It was an above-average season, with four tropical cyclones – the equivalent of a minimal hurricane – along with six tropical storms, one subtropical depression, and several depressions including one that was named. The basin is defined as the area west of 90°E and south of the Equator in the Indian Ocean, which includes the waters around Madagascar westward to the east coast of Africa. Tropical cyclones in this basin are monitored by the Regional Specialised Meteorological Centre in Réunion (MFR), (Note: Météo-France is the official Regional Specialized Meteorological Center for the south-west Indian Ocean, based out of Réunion.) as well as by the Joint Typhoon Warning Center (JTWC). (Note: The Joint Typhoon Warning Center is a joint United States Navy – United States Air Force task force that issues tropical cyclone warnings for the region.)

At the time, the season officially went from November 15, 1991, to April 30, 1992, although this season began in September with the formation of Tropical Storm Aviona in the northeastern portion of the basin. A month later, Tropical Storm Babie also formed in the northeastern portion of the basin before the season's official start. After several depressions formed in December and early January, Cyclone Colina formed and struck Réunion, which damaged houses and killed 2 people and left 12 missing there. Three storms were active at the same time in the middle of January, including Colina – Tropical Storm Dessilia moved across Madagascar with gusty winds, and Cyclone Edwina was the longest-lasting and strongest storm of the season. Edwina brushed the Mascarene Islands with gusty winds and light rainfall. In mid-February, Tropical Storm Finella brought locally heavy rainfall to Réunion, reaching 1,074 mm (42.3 in) along the island's east coast and causing minimal rainfall along the southern coast. The Intertropical Convergence Zone (ITCZ) became active toward the end of February, spawning tropical storms Gracia and Ionia as well as Tropical Depression Hutelle. Ionia, the last of five system to cross Madagascar during the season, killed eight people in the country. The season ended with Cyclone Jourdanne, which was the second-strongest storm of the season in April, and Cyclone Konita in May.

== Seasonal summary ==
During the season, the Météo-France office (MFR) on Réunion island issued warnings in tropical cyclones within the basin. The agency estimated intensity through the Dvorak technique, and warned on tropical cyclones in the region from the coast of Africa to 90° E, south of the equator. The Joint Typhoon Warning Center (JTWC), which is a joint United States Navy – United States Air Force task force, also issued tropical cyclone warnings for the southwestern Indian Ocean. The storms in the season lasted about five days on average, although Cyclone Edwina lasted the longest at 11 days. Storms formed throughout the basin and were fairly evenly distributed throughout the season, with the exception of a lull in November. Most storms originated from the Intertropical Convergence Zone (ITCZ). MFR named storms throughout the season using 11 names from a sequential list. The remainder of the list was Laura, Monette, Neige, Octavie, Pamela, Rosita, Stella, Tasiana, Vigonia, Wendy, and Yolande.

== Systems ==
=== Moderate Tropical Storm Aviona ===
- Moderate tropical storm (MFR)
- Category 1 tropical cyclone (SSHWS)
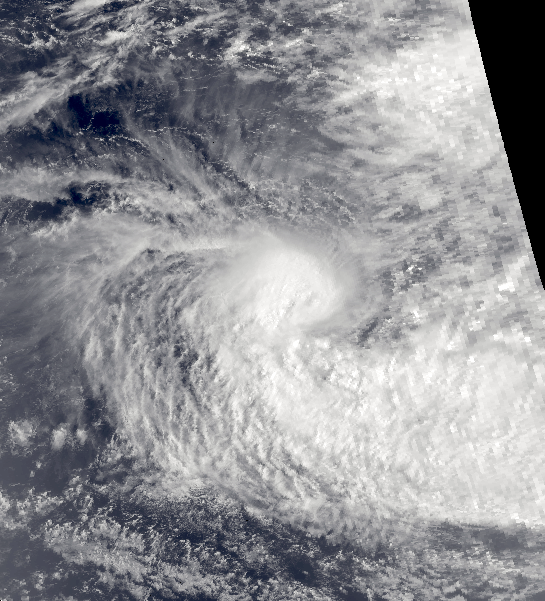
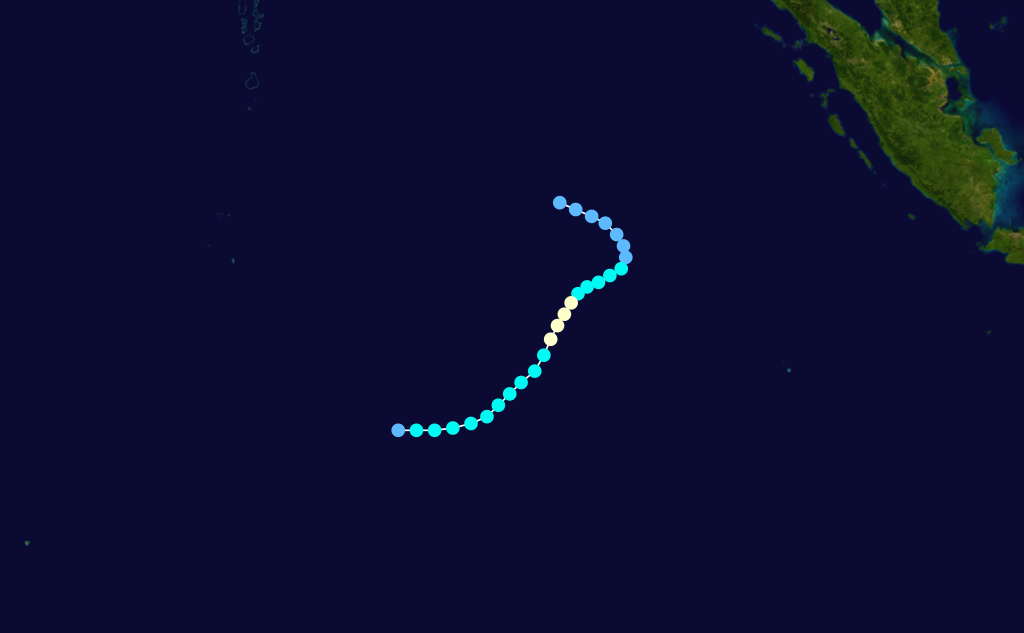
- Duration: September 27 – October 5
- Peak intensity: 75 km/h (45 mph) (10-min); 988 hPa (mbar)

On September 25, a low-pressure area persisted between the Cocos Islands and Sumatra in the Australian region, east of 90° E. It moved southwestward into the south-west Indian Ocean due to a large ridge to the south. The system slowly organized, becoming a tropical disturbance on September 27; on the same day, the JTWC also initiated advisories on the system as Tropical Cyclone 01S. This marked an unusual event of such an early storm formation. On September 29, the system was named Moderate Tropical Storm Aviona, although the MFR later assessed that the system reached tropical storm status on the previous day. In addition, the JTWC estimated the system attained 1-minute sustained peak winds of 120 km/h (75 mph) on September 28, the equivalent of a minimal hurricane. When Aviona was named, the MFR estimated peak 10-minute sustained winds of 75 km/h (45 km/h). Subsequently, increased wind shear incurred weakening due to a trough to the south, which stripped the convection from the center. A building ridge behind the trough turned Aviona to the west. The storm weakened to a depression on October 1, the same day the JTWC discontinued advisories. The circulation continued generally west-southwestward until dissipating on October 5 to the north of Rodrigues island.

=== Moderate Tropical Storm Babie ===
- Moderate tropical storm (MFR)
- Tropical storm (SSHWS)
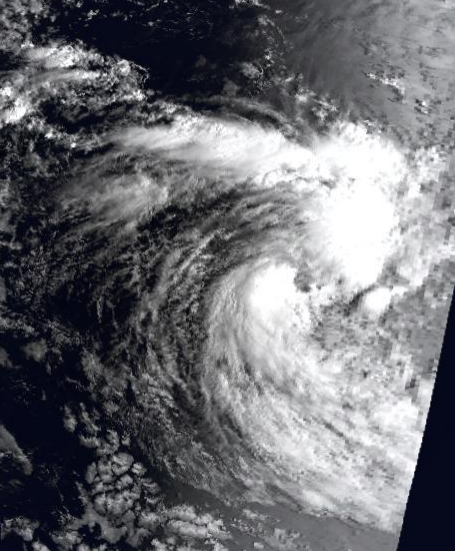
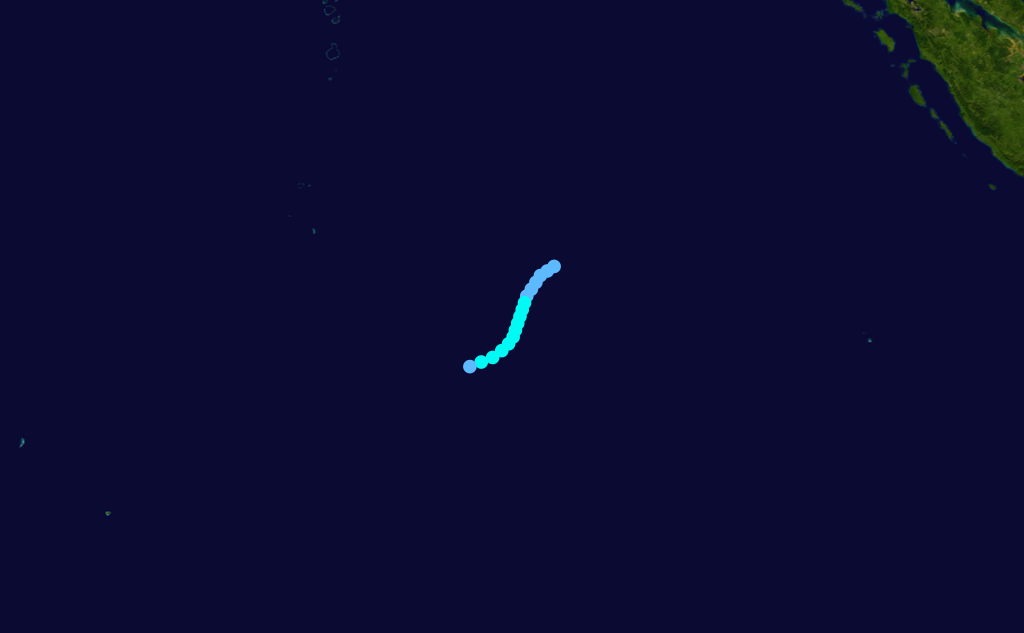
- Duration: October 18 – October 21
- Peak intensity: 70 km/h (45 mph) (10-min); 991 hPa (mbar)

The ITCZ became active on October 17, spawning an area of disturbed weather about 900 km (560 mi) east of Diego Garcia in conjunction with a pre-existing low-pressure area. Convection quickly organized around a center, and a tropical disturbance formed on October 18. On the same day, the JTWC began issuing warnings on the system as Tropical Cyclone 02S. A trough to the south steered the system to the south-southwest. Following steady intensification, the disturbance became Tropical Storm Babie on October 19, reaching peak winds of 70 km/h (45 mph). A building ridge to the south increased wind shear, causing Babie to quickly weaken; the JTWC and MFR discontinued advisories on October 21, and the circulation dissipated on October 23.

=== Tropical Depression C1 ===
- Tropical depression (MFR)
- Tropical storm (SSHWS)
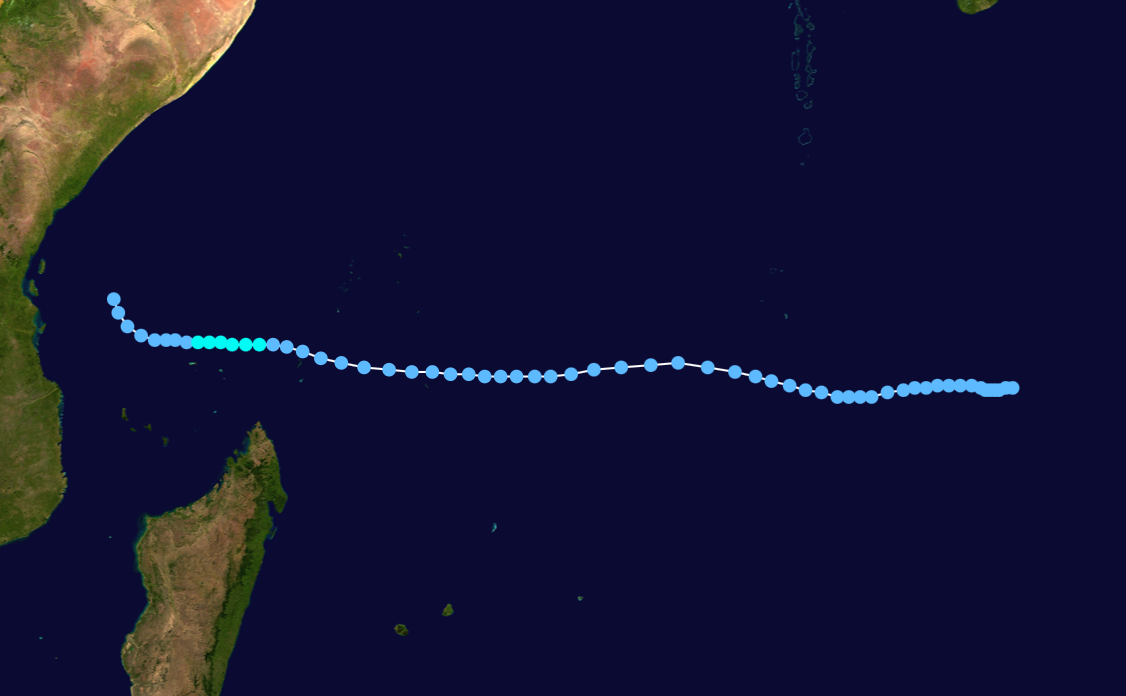
- Duration: December 4 – December 10
- Peak intensity: 50 km/h (30 mph) (10-min); 997 hPa (mbar)

Tropical Depression C1 originated from the ITCZ in the northeastern portion of the basin from a small area of convection on November 24. It moved westward with pulsating convection around the center, failing to organize due to the presence of wind shear. On December 4, the system organized into a tropical disturbance, and three days later it passed about 400 km (250 mi) north of the northern tip of Madagascar. That day, it intensified to tropical depression status, reaching peak winds of 50 km/h (30 mph). Increased wind shear weakened the convection, and the circulation dissipated on December 10.

=== Tropical Cyclone Colina ===
- Tropical cyclone (MFR)
- Category 2 tropical cyclone (SSHWS)
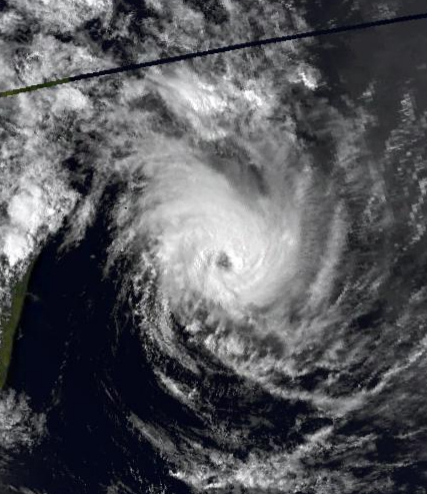
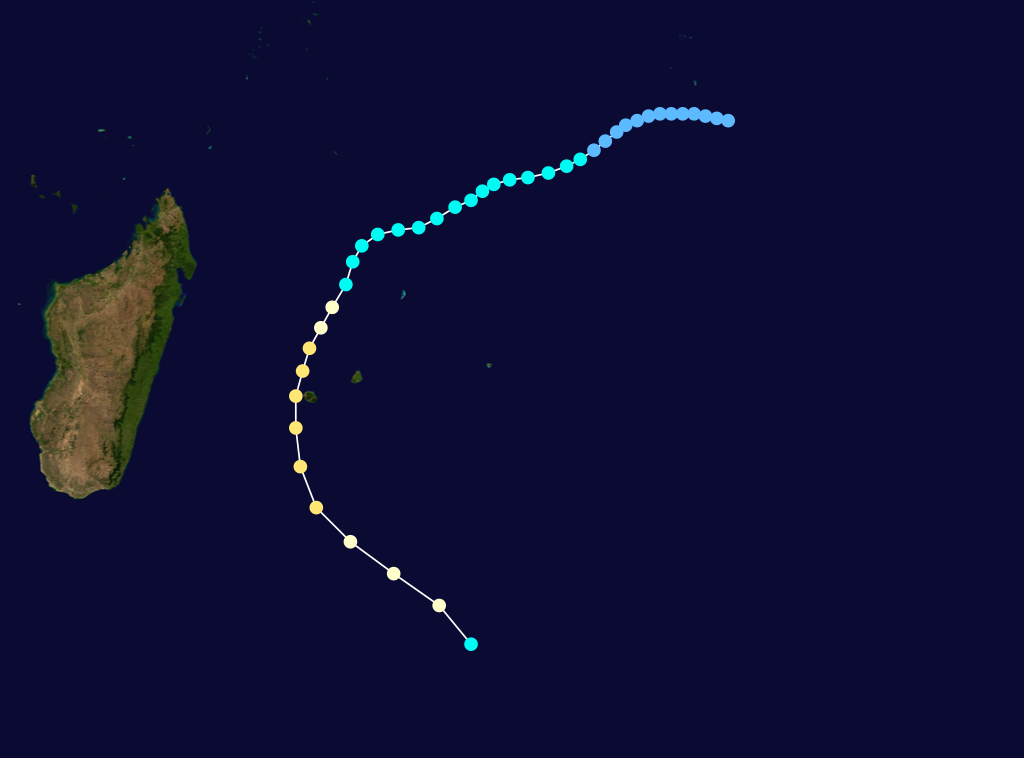
- Duration: January 13 – January 20
- Peak intensity: 135 km/h (85 mph) (10-min); 970 hPa (mbar)

The ITCZ spawned an area of convection on January 11 near the Chagos Archipelago. A circulation developed within the system on January 13 about 400 km (250 mi) southwest of Diego Garcia, and at that time it became a tropical disturbance. A large ridge to the south steered the system generally to the southwest. The disturbance intensified into a depression on January 14, the same date that the JTWC initiated advisories on Tropical Cyclone 10S, and following an increase in convection, the depression intensified into Moderate Tropical Storm Colina on January 15. Turning more to the south-southwest, Colina strengthened further into a tropical cyclone on January 18, developing a 30 km (19 mi) eye. On the next day, the cyclone attained peak 10-minute winds of 135 km/h (85 mph), according to MFR, while the JTWC estimated peak 1-minute winds of 175 km/h (110 mph). That day, the eye crossed over the western portion of Réunion at around 14:30 UTC, exiting 45 minutes later. Subsequently, Colina accelerated to the southeast over cooler waters, weakening in the process. On January 20, the cyclone weakened to tropical storm status, and the next day Colina became extratropical, dissipating two days later.

Early in its duration, Colina dropped rainfall in Seychelles through the interaction with the ITCZ. The rains caused flooding and mudslides, and the storm also produced high waves and gusty winds. Moving across Réunion, Colina produced strong wind gusts in the mountainous peaks, reaching 205 km/h (127 mph) at La Plaine-des-Palmistes. The storm dropped rainfall across the entire island, peaking at 894 mm (35.2 in) at Mafate in a 24‑hour period. The winds and rainfall damaged crops and houses and also caused power outages. The storm killed two people on the island during its passage, with 12 others missing. On nearby Mauritius, Colina dropped about 106 mm (4.2 in) of rainfall and produced wind gusts of 114 km/h (71 mph); the storm did not cause much damage there.

=== Severe Tropical Storm Dessilia ===
- Severe tropical storm (MFR)
- Tropical storm (SSHWS)
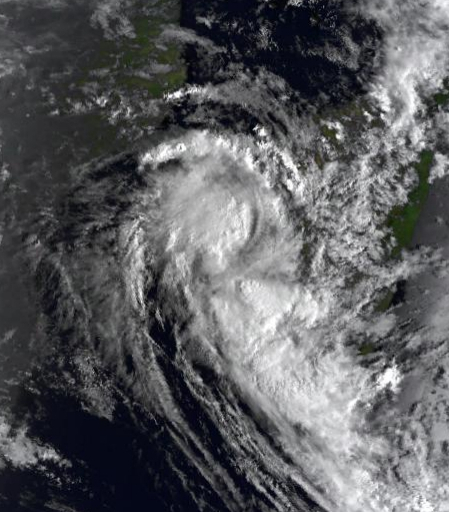
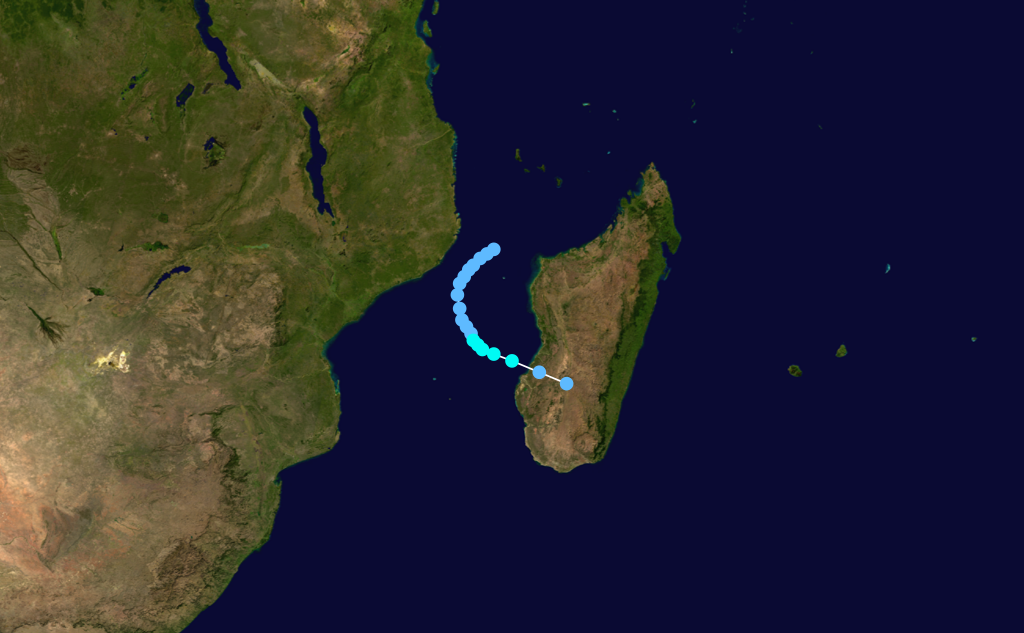
- Duration: January 16 – January 24
- Peak intensity: 95 km/h (60 mph) (10-min); 975 hPa (mbar)

While Colina was intensifying northeast of Réunion, the monsoon spawned an area of convection in conjunction with a low-pressure area in the Mozambique Channel. On January 16, the system developed into a tropical disturbance, although initially the circulation was poorly defined. It moved toward the coast of Mozambique before turning southeastward and organizing more. The system intensified into Tropical Storm Dessilia on January 19, reaching peak 10 minute winds of 95 km/h (60 mph) at 12:00 UTC on the next day. At around that time, Dessilia made landfall on northwestern Madagascar between Morondava and Morombe. Over a 30-hour period, the storm moved southeastward across the country, remaining fairly well-organized. Initially, it appeared that Colina absorbed Dessilia once the latter storm emerged from the Madagascar coastline, although they remained separate systems. After having weakened to tropical depression status, Dessilia restrengthened into a tropical storm on January 22. Increased wind shear weakened the convection, and the storm dissipated on January 24; the next day, the remnants were absorbed by a passing cold front.

While intensifying and passing near Juan de Nova Island, Dessilia produced wind gusts of 98 km/h (61 mph). Wind gusts on Madagascar reached 104 km/h (65 mph) at Morombe. Later, the storm produced 3 to 4 m (9.8 to 13.1 ft) waves to the southwest coast of Réunion.

=== Intense Tropical Cyclone Edwina ===
- Intense tropical cyclone (MFR)
- Category 3 tropical cyclone (SSHWS)
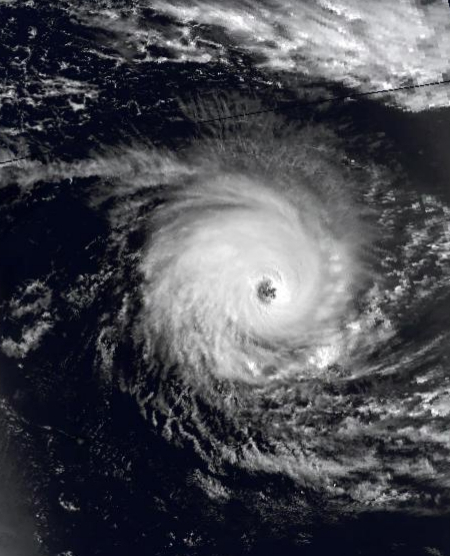
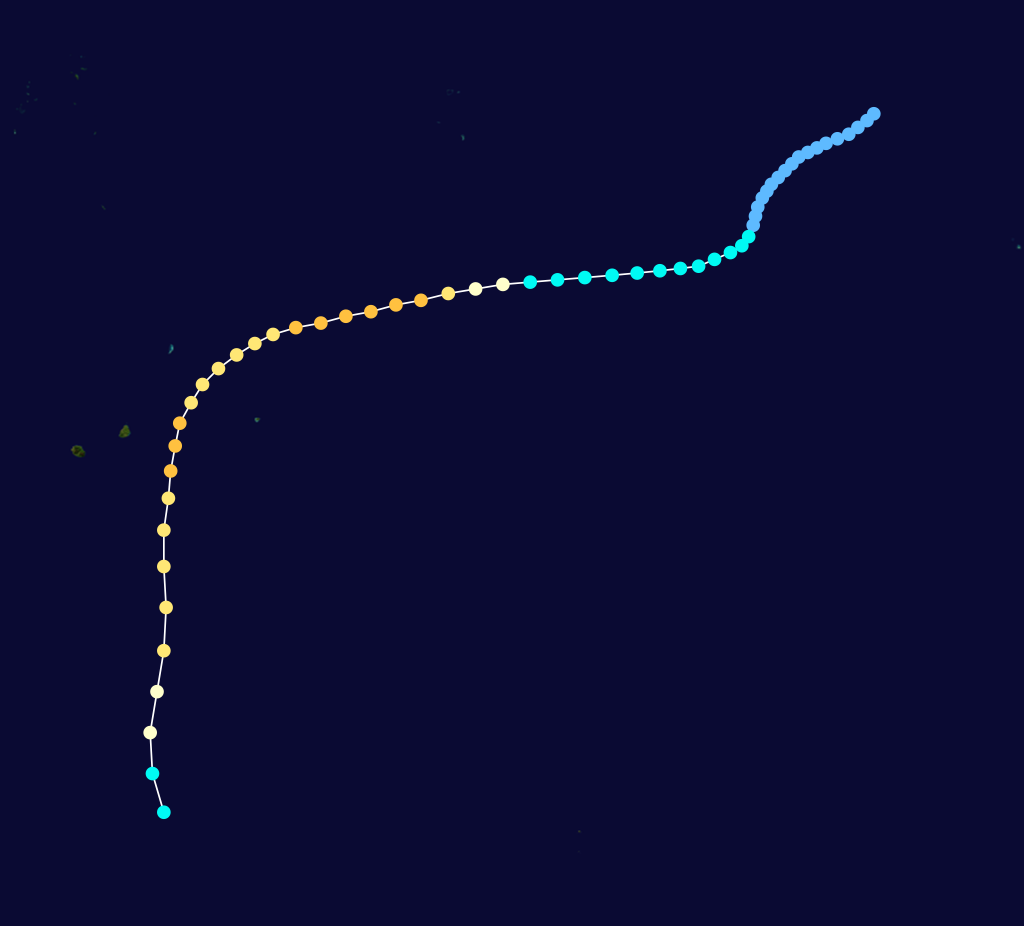
- Duration: January 19 – January 29
- Peak intensity: 175 km/h (110 mph) (10-min); 925 hPa (mbar)

A few days after Colina formed, the ITCZ spawned another area of convection on January 16 in the northeast portion of the basin. The next day, a low-pressure area formed between the Chagos Archipelago and Diego Garcia, and on January 19 the system developed into a tropical disturbance after convection increased. Following further organization, the system intensified into Tropical Storm Edwina on January 20 while moving generally westward. Increasing wind shear prevented significant strengthening initially, but Edwina was able to intensify more on January 21. On January 23, the JTWC upgraded the storm to the equivalent of a minimal hurricane on the same day that MFR upgraded Edwina to tropical cyclone status. On the next day, the JTWC estimated the cyclone attained peak winds of 205 km/h (125 mph), after Edwina developed a well-defined 75 km (47 mi) wide eye. On January 26, the MFR estimated that the cyclone reached peak 10-minute winds of 170 km/h (105 mph), making Edwina the strongest storm of the season. Around that time, the cyclone turned more to the south around a large ridge, maintaining peak winds through January 27. By that time, the eye became large and ragged while passing halfway between Rodrigues and St. Brandon. On January 27, Edwina passed about 220 km (140 mi) east of Mauritius. On the next day, increased wind shear caused marked weakening, quickly destroying the eye and lowering the winds below tropical cyclone force. On January 29, Edwina ceased existing as a tropical system, although its remnants persisted several more days, affecting Île Amsterdam in the south-central Indian Ocean on February 2.

On Rodrigues island, Edwina produced peak wind gusts of 145 km/h (90 mph). The fringes of the storm affected Mauritius, producing peak gusts of 124 km/h (77 mph) and 108 mm (4.3 in) of rainfall. Farther west, Edwina produced gusts of 104 km/h (65 mph) on Réunion.

=== Moderate Tropical Storm Finella ===
- Moderate tropical storm (MFR)
- Category 1 tropical cyclone (SSHWS)
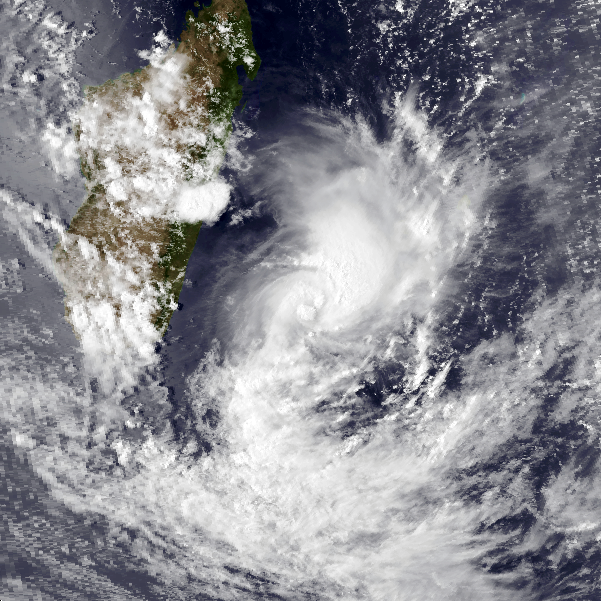
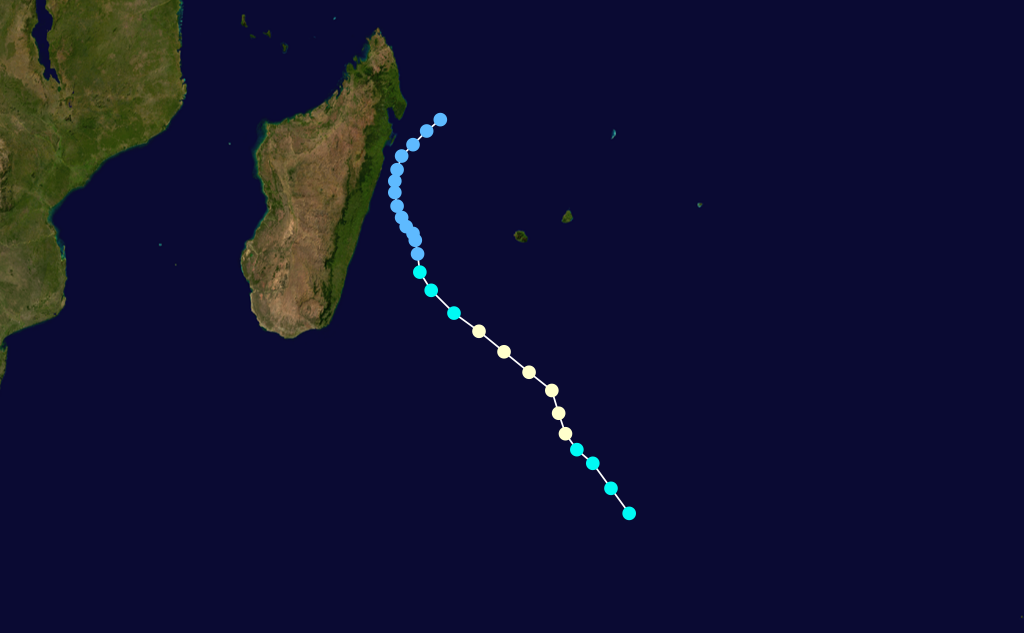
- Duration: February 12 – February 15
- Peak intensity: 80 km/h (50 mph) (10-min); 984 hPa (mbar)

A large low-pressure area persisted on February 11 across northern Madagascar, centered near Cape Masoala along the country's eastern coast. Moving southward and later southeastward due to a trough, the system developed into a tropical disturbance on February 12 and slowly organized. On the next day, the JTWC began tracking the system as Tropical Cyclone 19S. The MFR upgraded the system to Tropical Storm Finella on February 14 after an eye feature developed within the central dense overcast. As a result, the JTWC upgraded the system to the equivalent of a minimal hurricane that day, estimating peak 1-minute winds of 130 km/h (80 mph), although the MFR only estimated peak 10-minute winds of 80 km/h (50 mph). Increased wind shear weakened Finella, and it was no longer a tropical depression on February 15.

Finella produced localized heavy rainfall in Réunion. Saint-Benoît along the east coast recorded 1,074 mm (42.3 in) of precipitation in 24 hours, including 122 mm (4.8 in) that fell in just one hour. The southern portion of the island received minimal rainfall, in contrast.

=== Moderate Tropical Storm Gracia ===
- Moderate tropical storm (MFR)
- Tropical storm (SSHWS)
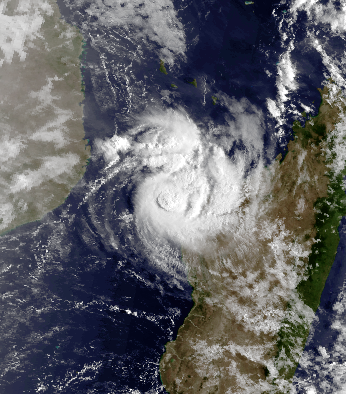
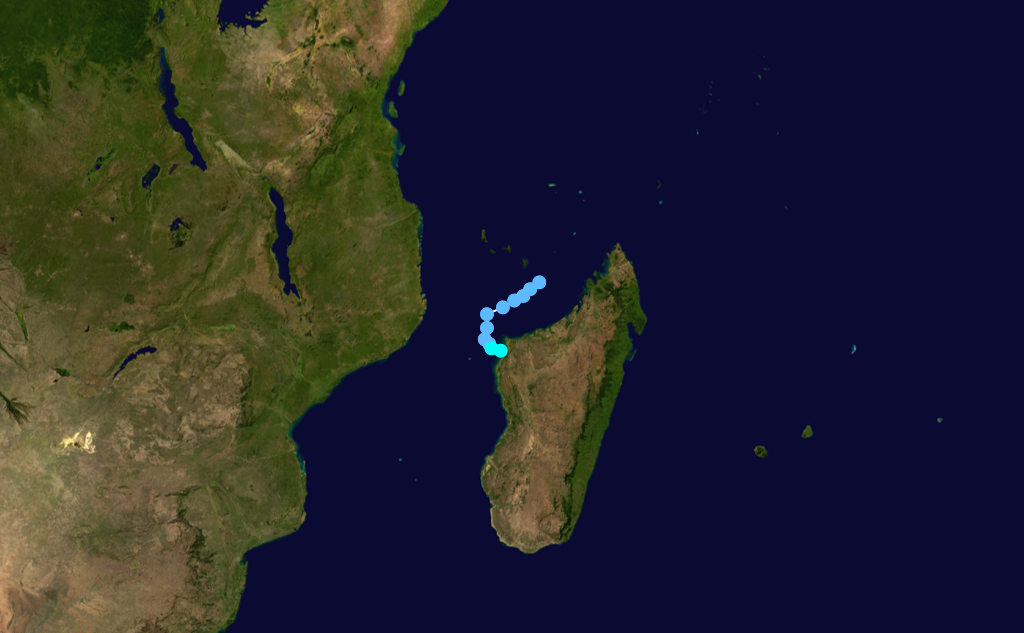
- Duration: February 20 – February 23
- Peak intensity: 70 km/h (45 mph) (10-min); 990 hPa (mbar)

A circulation within the ITCZ developed on February 20 just south of Mayotte in the Mozambique Channel. It developed good outflow and showed initial signs of development, although on February 21 the system weakened. The convection reorganized, developing a ragged eye with circular rainbands, and the system intensified into Tropical Storm Gracia on February 22. It was a small system, just 100 km (60 mi) from the Madagascar coast when it attained tropical storm status. Late on February 22, the storm attained peak winds of 70 km/h (45 mph). Shortly thereafter, the convection rapidly disintegrated as Gracia made landfall on northwestern Madagascar near Besalampy, dissipating early on February 23. The storm produced locally heavy rainfall, reaching 140 mm (5.5 in) where it made landfall. The JTWC did not track the system.

=== Moderate Tropical Storm Ionia ===
- Moderate tropical storm (MFR)
- Tropical storm (SSHWS)
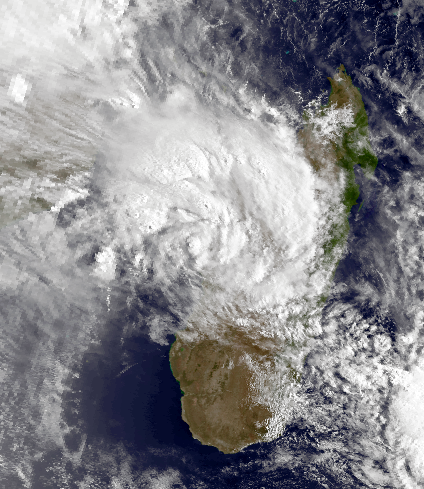
- Duration: March 2 – March 7
- Peak intensity: 65 km/h (40 mph) (10-min); 993 hPa (mbar)

The ITCZ remained active in early March, spawning a tropical depression in the northern Mozambique Channel on March 2. It failed to organize at first, although an increase in convection on March 3 allowed the system to strengthen into Tropical Storm Ionia. That day, it attained peak winds of 65 km/h (40 mph). After passing about 50 km (30 mi) north of Juan de Nova island, Ionia progressed southeastward and approached the western Madagascar coastline. The circulation paralleled the coast for about 250 km (160 mi) before moving ashore at Belo on March 4. The storm weakened over land, re-emerging over open waters on March 5 from southeastern Madagascar. Ionia briefly re-intensified into a tropical depression that night, but it lost tropical characteristics on March 7. The remnants persisted several more days until dissipating south of the Mascarene Islands on March 11.

The fifth depression of the season to move across Madagascar, Ionia dropped heavy rainfall, reaching 356 mm (14 in) in some areas; this caused river flooding in southern Madagascar. The storm left 3,644 people homeless and killed eight.

=== Intense Tropical Cyclone Jourdanne ===
- Intense tropical cyclone (MFR)
- Category 4 tropical cyclone (SSHWS)
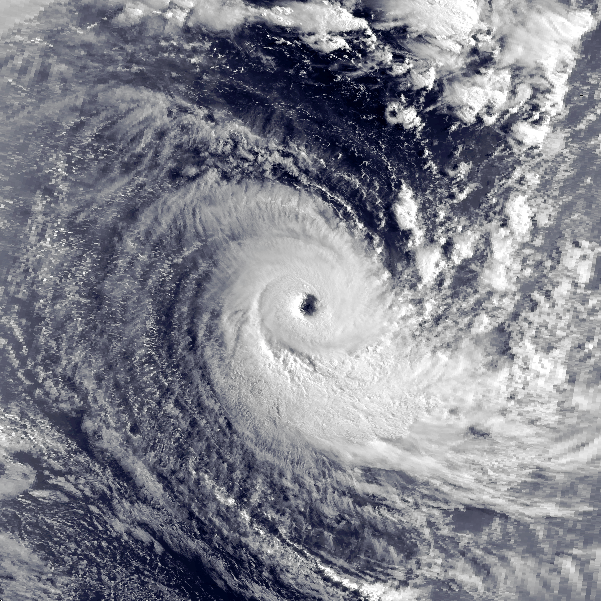
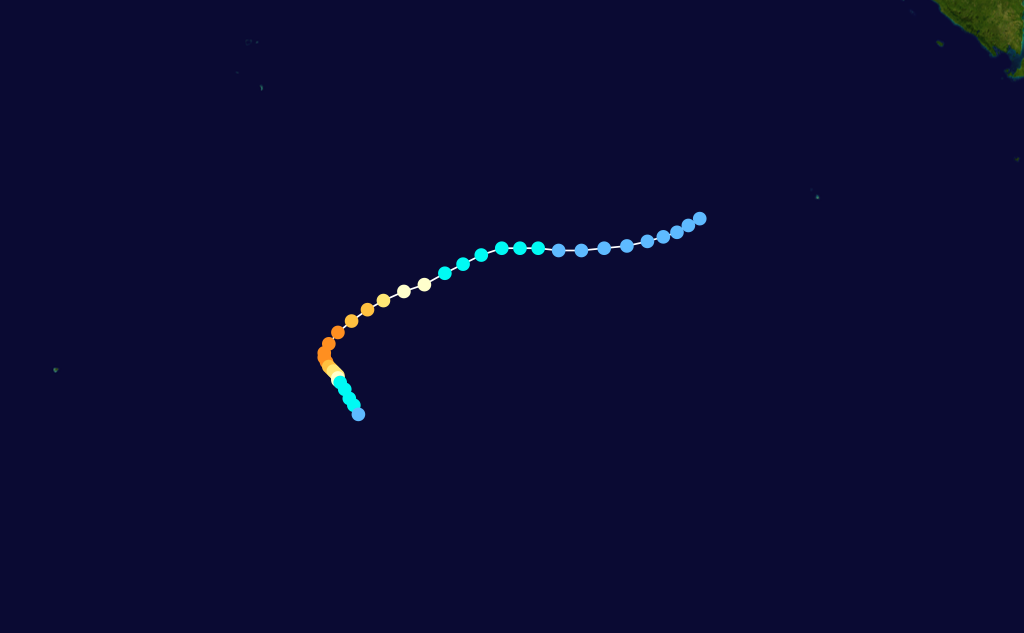
- Duration: April 2 – April 10
- Peak intensity: 165 km/h (105 mph) (10-min); 930 hPa (mbar)

After a period of inactivity lasting slightly less than a month, the tropics became active again in early April when the ITCZ spawned an area of convection in the northeastern portion of the basin. This was in association with a preexisting low-pressure area, and developed into a tropical disturbance on April 2. On the next day, the JTWC began tracking the system as Tropical Cyclone 24S. The system moved to the west-southwest due to a ridge to the south, gradually intensifying due to favorable conditions, such as warm water temperatures. On April 4, the system intensified into a tropical storm and was given the name Jourdanne. An eye developed on April 5, indicating that the storm attained tropical cyclone status. Although the convection was initially elongated, Jourdanne became much more symmetrical on April 6, which corresponded to its peak 10-minute intensity of 165 km/h (105 mph) that day. Around the same time, the JTWC estimated peak 1-minute winds of 230 km/h (145 mph), which was tied for the strongest system in the southern hemisphere in the cyclone year by the agency. (Note: The cyclone year for the southern hemisphere is from July 1 to June 30 of the subsequent year.) Due to a trough in the region, Jourdanne executed a small loop and turned to a southeast drift. Gradually increasing wind shear induced weakening, causing the eye to dissipate on April 7. On the next day, Jourdanne weakened below tropical cyclone intensity, and on April 9, the convection was stripped from the center. By the next day, Jourdanne was no longer a tropical disturbance, although its remnants persisted April 15.

=== Tropical Cyclone Konita ===
- Tropical cyclone (MFR)
- Category 2 tropical cyclone (SSHWS)
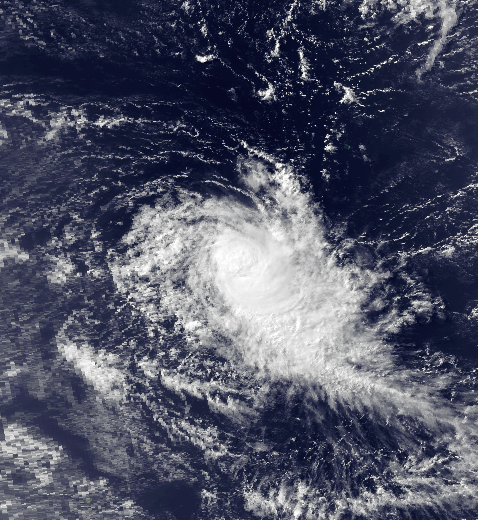
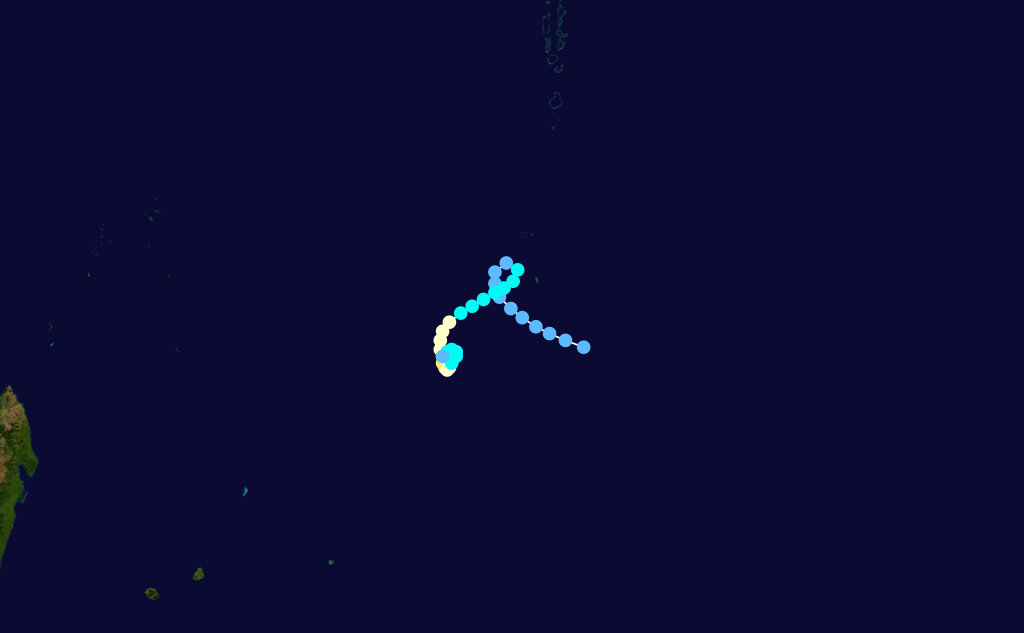
- Duration: May 2 – May 7
- Peak intensity: 130 km/h (80 mph) (10-min); 955 hPa (mbar)

A low-pressure area formed on April 29 to the southeast of the Chagos Archipelago with an area of convection, but it failed to organize into a tropical disturbance until May 2. By that time, the JTWC was already classifying it as Tropical Cyclone 26S, and the system gradually organized while moving southwestward. Despite being late in the season, the system intensified into Tropical Storm Konita on May 4, and the next day attained tropical cyclone status. The upgrade was based on satellite imagery showing an eye, with MFR estimating peak 10-minute winds of 130 km/h (80 mph), and JTWC estimating 1-minute winds of 165 km/h (105 mph). By the time of peak intensity, Konita was moving more to the south into an area of weak steering currents. A trough northwest of the storm caused the convection to rapidly diminish, leaving the center exposed from the thunderstorms on May 6. After moving erratically to the northeast and looping, Konita dissipated on May 7. The storm did not directly affect land, although it indirectly caused an increase of rainfall over Seychelles.

=== Other systems ===
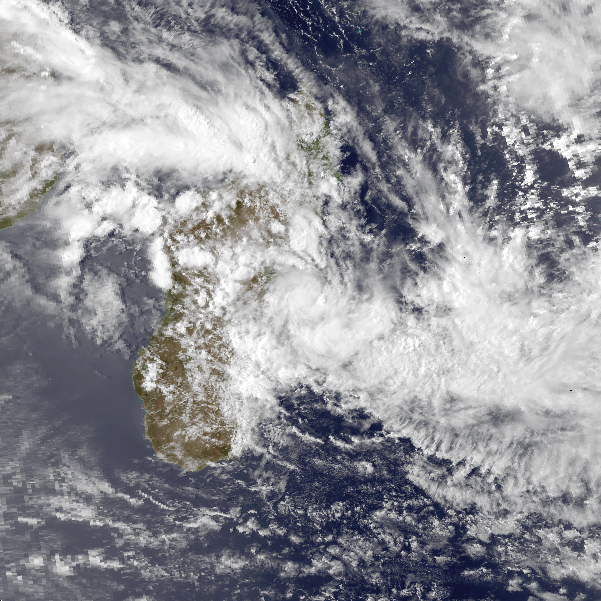
Tropical Depression Hutelle making landfall on Madagascar

On December 18, a tropical low developed in the Australian basin northeast of the Cocos Islands. It moved southwestward, intensifying into a tropical storm and being named Ken by the BoM. Wind shear in the region prevented much development, and the storm crossed into the south-west Indian Ocean on December 21. At that time, the MFR classified the system as Tropical Depression C2, but the agency only issued two warnings. The JTWC tracked the system until December 23 when the system dissipated well to the southwest of Indonesia.

On December 24, a cold front exited the southern African coastline, accompanied by a low-pressure area that moved into the Mozambique Channel. The system produced a large area of convection, and with warm water temperatures in the area, the low gradually organized. On December 26, the MFR began tracking the system off the southwest coast of Madagascar. Around that time, the convection began to wrap into the center, while the system produced gale-force winds on Europa Island. The storm tracked generally to the southeast, passing south of Madagascar while intensifying gradually. Due to the structure, the storm was considered a subtropical depression. Late on December 26, the storm attained peak winds of 65 km/h (40 mph), but subsequently, increased wind shear caused weakening. The subtropical storm continued to the southeast until December 30, when an approaching trough absorbed it.

After the subtropical depression dissipated, there were three additional depressions before Tropical Cyclone Colina developed on January 11. The ITCZ became active toward the end of February. On February 24, Tropical Disturbance H1 formed from a low-pressure area to the west of Réunion. It moved quickly to the southeast, intensifying into a tropical depression, but dissipating on February 26 when it was absorbed into a trough. A day later, another disturbance formed near Réunion, which produced torrential rainfall, reaching 1 to 2 m (3.3 to 6.6 ft) in some locations. The system moved westward, intensifying into a tropical depression after further organization. Despite not being a tropical storm, the system was named Hutelle by the Meteorological Service of Madagascar on March 1. Shortly thereafter, Hutelle made landfall near Mahanoro, Madagascar, and dissipated the next day.

== Season effects ==
This table lists all the cyclones that developed in the Indian Ocean, during the 1993–94 South-West Indian Ocean cyclone season. It includes their intensity, duration, name, landfalls, deaths, and damages.

Name	Dates	Peak intensity			Areas affected	Damage (USD)	Deaths	Refs
Name	Dates	Category	Wind speed	Pressure	Areas affected	Damage (USD)	Deaths	Refs
Avoina	September 29 – October 4, 1992	Moderate tropical storm	75 km/h (45 mph)	988 hPa (29.18 inHg)	None	None	None	
Babie	October 18 – 21, 1992	Moderate tropical storm	70 km/h (45 mph)	991 hPa (29.26 inHg)	None	None	None	
Colina	January 13–20	Tropical Cyclone	135 km/h (85 mph)	970 hPa (28.64 inHg)	Seychelles, Mauritius, Reunion		14	
Dessilia	January 16–24	Severe Tropical Storm	95 km/h (60 mph)	975 hPa (28.79 inHg)	Juan de Nova Island, Madagascar			
Edwina	January 19–29	Intense Tropical Cyclone	170 km/h (105 mph)	925 hPa (27.32 inHg)	Rodrigues, Mauritius, Reunion			
Finella	February 12–15	Moderate Tropical Storm	80 km/h (50 mph)	984 hPa (29.06 inHg)	Reunion	$5.9 million		
Gracia	February 20–23	Moderate Tropical Storm	70 km/h (45 mph)	990 hPa (29.23 inHg)	Madagascar			
Hutelle	February 27 – March 2	Tropical Depression	50 km/h (30 mph)	1000 hPa (29.53 inHg)	Madagascar			
Ionia	March 2 – March 7	Moderate Tropical Storm	65 km/h (40 mph)	993 hPa (29.32 inHg)	Madagascar		8	
Jourdanne	April 2–10	Intense Tropical Cyclone	165 km/h (105 mph)	930 hPa (27.46 inHg)				
Konita	May 2 – 5, 1993	Tropical cyclone	130 km/h (80 mph)	955 hPa (28.20 inHg)	None	None	None	
Season aggregates
9 systems	September 27 – May 7		170 km/h (105 mph)	925 hPa (27.31 in Hg)		$ 5.9 million	11	

== See also ==
- List of Southern Hemisphere tropical cyclone seasons
- Atlantic hurricane seasons: 1992, 1993
- Pacific hurricane seasons: 1992, 1993
- Pacific typhoon seasons: 1992, 1993
- North Indian Ocean cyclone seasons: 1992, 1993
